= Collective dose =

Sum of all radiation over a time period

The collective effective dose, dose quantity S, is calculated as the sum of all individual effective doses over the time period or during the operation being considered due to ionizing radiation. It can be used to estimate the total health effects of a process or accidental release involving ionizing radiation to an exposed population. The total collective dose is the dose to the exposed human population between the time of release until its elimination from the environment, perhaps integrating to time equals infinity. However, doses are generally reported for specific populations and a stated time interval. The International Commission on Radiological Protection (ICRP) states: "To avoid aggregation of low individual doses over extended time periods and wide geographical regions the range in effective dose and the time period should be limited and specified.

== Limitations ==
The ICRP states; "Collective effective dose is an instrument for optimisation, for comparing radiological technologies and protection procedures. Collective effective dose is not intended as a tool for epidemiological studies, and it is inappropriate to use it in risk projections. This is because the assumptions implicit in the calculation of collective effective dose (e.g., when applying the LNT model) conceal large biological and statistical uncertainties. Specifically, the computation of cancer deaths based on collective effective doses involving trivial exposures to large populations is not reasonable and should be avoided.

All calculations that involve adding doses assume the Linear no-threshold model (LNT) for health effects. Particularly the collective dose will not give a good indication of health consequences where the doses to some individuals are large enough to cause to deterministic effects. The cancer risk due to a unit dose of radiation depends on the age and other characteristics of the population. Small local populations, for example radiation workers, may not have a typical population profile.

Both LNT and the concept of "collective dose" are criticized as speculative, lacking empirical evidence and based on unproved assumption that radiation "effect is cumulative over one’s lifetime, regardless of how low the rate of delivery of that dose (dose rate)".

Releases of radioisotopes can expose future generations to ionizing radiation and the calculation of the collective dose from such releases will contain uncertainties. For example, it is impossible to be sure of future population sizes and habits (e.g. diet and agricultural practices). Also the effects of a given radiation dose in the future may be greater (longer life expectancies) or less (improvements in cancer treatment) than for current exposures.

When calculating the total collective dose due to a release of long-lived radionuclides (e.g. Carbon-14) it is necessary to make assumptions about the habits and population sizes of future generations, and sometimes it is assumed that population sizes and behaviour remain the same for all time.

== Dose units ==
The SI unit for Collective dose, S, is man-sieverts. The person-rem is sometimes used as the non SI unit in some regulatory systems.

== Examples ==
Atmospheric nuclear weapons tests in isolated areas often resulted in doses of less than 1 mSv to any individual. All the thousands of atmospheric tests that occurred in the 20th century together now cause a 30,000 man-Sv collective dose each year from fallout. The annual dose reduces each year.

== See also ==
- Radioactivity
- Radiation poisoning
- Ionizing radiation
- Total effective dose equivalent
- Deep-dose equivalent
- Cumulative dose
- Committed dose equivalent
- Committed effective dose equivalent
- absorbed dose
- effective dose (radiation)
- equivalent dose
- sievert
