= Committed dose =

Measure of radiation health risk

The committed dose in radiological protection is a measure of the stochastic health risk due to an intake of radioactive material into the human body. Stochastic in this context is defined as the probability of cancer induction and genetic damage, due to low levels of radiation. The SI unit of measure is the sievert.

A committed dose from an internal source represents the same effective risk as the same amount of effective dose applied uniformly to the whole body from an external source, or the same amount of equivalent dose applied to part of the body. The committed dose is not intended as a measure for deterministic effects, such as radiation sickness, which are defined as the severity of a health effect which is certain to happen.

The radiation risk proposed by the International Commission on Radiological Protection (ICRP) predicts that an effective dose of one sievert carries a 5.5% chance of developing cancer. Such a risk is the sum of both internal and external radiation dose.

== ICRP definition ==
The ICRP states "Radionuclides incorporated in the human body irradiate the tissues over time periods determined by their physical half-life and their biological retention within the body. Thus they may give rise to doses to body tissues for many months or years after the intake. The need to regulate exposures to radionuclides and the accumulation of radiation dose over extended periods of time has led to the definition of committed dose quantities".

The ICRP defines two dose quantities for individual committed dose.

- Committed equivalent dose is "the time integral of the equivalent dose rate in a particular tissue or organ that will be received by an individual following intake of radioactive material into the body by a Reference Person". This refers specifically to the dose in a specific tissue or organ, in the similar way to external equivalent dose.
- Committed effective dose is "the sum of the products of the committed organ or tissue equivalent doses and the appropriate tissue weighting factors W_{T} [...]. The commitment period is taken to be 50 years for adults, and to age 70 years for children." This refers specifically to the dose to the whole body, in the similar way to external effective dose. The committed effective dose is used to demonstrate compliance with dose limits and is entered into the "dose of record" for occupational exposures used for recording, reporting and retrospective demonstration of compliance with regulatory dose limits.

The ICRP further states "For internal exposure, committed effective doses are generally determined from an assessment of the intakes of radionuclides from bioassay measurements or other quantities (e.g., activity retained in the body or in daily excreta). The radiation dose is determined from the intake using recommended dose coefficients".

== Dose intake ==
The intake of radioactive material can occur through four pathways:

- inhalation of airborne contaminants such as radon
- ingestion of contaminated food or liquids
- absorption of vapours such as tritium oxide through the skin
- injection of medical radioisotopes such as technetium-99m

Some artificial radioisotopes such as iodine-131 are chemically identical to natural isotopes needed by the body, and may be more readily absorbed if the individual has a deficit of that element. For instance, potassium iodide (KI), administered orally immediately after exposure, may be used to protect the thyroid from ingested radioactive iodine in the event of an accident or attack at a nuclear power plant, or the detonation of a nuclear explosive which would release radioactive iodine.

Other radioisotopes have an affinity for particular tissues and may be retained there for years in spite of their foreign nature. Since radium and strontium are chemically similar to calcium, they tend to absorb into bone tissue. Elements like these are known as bone seekers. Plutonium is additionally a bone seeker, but its mechanism of absorption into bone is unknown.

== Physical factors ==
Since irradiation increases with proximity to the source of radiation, and as it is impossible to distance or shield an internal source, radioactive materials inside the body can deliver much higher doses to the host organs than they normally would from outside the body. This is particularly true for alpha and beta emitters that are easily shielded by skin and clothing. Some have hypothesized that alpha's high relative biological effectiveness might be attributable to cell's tendency to absorb transuranic metals into the cellular nucleus where they would be in very close proximity to the genome, though an elevated effectiveness can also be observed for external alpha radiation in cellular studies. As in the calculations for equivalent dose and effective dose, committed dose must include corrections for the relative biological effectiveness of the radiation type and weightings for tissue sensitivity.

== Duration ==
The dose rate from a single uptake decays over time due to both radioactive decay, and biological decay (i.e. excretion from the body). The combined radioactive and biological half-life, called the effective half-life of the material, may range from hours for medical radioisotopes to decades for transuranic waste. Committed dose is the integral of this decaying dose rate over the presumed remaining lifespan of the organism. Most regulations require this integral to be taken over 50 years for uptakes during adulthood or over 70 years for uptakes during childhood. In dosimetry accounting, the entire committed dose is conservatively assigned to the year of uptake, even though it may take many years for the tissues to actually accumulate this dose.

== Measurement ==
There is no direct way to measure committed dose. Estimates can be made by analyzing the data from whole body counting, blood samples, urine samples, fecal samples, biopsies, and measurement of intake.

Whole body counting (WBC) is the most direct approach, but has some limitations: it cannot detect beta emitters such as tritium; it provides no chemical information about any compound that the radioisotope may be bound to; it may be inconclusive regarding the nature of the radioisotope detected; and it is a complex measurement subject to many sources of measurement and calibration error.

Analysis of blood samples, urine samples, fecal samples, and biopsies can provide more exact information about the chemical and isotopic nature of the contaminant, its distribution in the body, and the rate of elimination. Urine samples are the standard way to measure tritium intake, while fecal samples are the standard way to measure transuranic intake.

If the nature and quantity of radioactive materials taken into the body is known, and a reliable biochemical model of this material is available, this can be sufficient to determine committed dose. In occupational or accident scenarios, approximate estimates can be based on measurements of the environment that people were exposed to, but this cannot take into account factors such as breathing rate and adherence to hygiene practices. Exact information about the intake and its biochemical impact is usually only available in medical situations where radiopharmaceuticals are measured in a radioisotope dose calibrator prior to injection.

Annual limit on intake (ALI) is the derived limit for the amount of radioactive material taken into the body of an adult worker by inhalation or ingestion in a year. ALI is the intake of a given radionuclide in a year that would result in:

- a committed effective dose equivalent of 0.02 Sv (2 rems) for a "reference human body", or
- a committed dose equivalent of 0.2 Sv (20 rems) to any individual organ or tissue,

whatever dose is the smaller.

== Health effects ==
Intake of radioactive materials into the body tends to increase the risk of cancer, and possibly other stochastic effects. The International Commission on Radiological Protection has proposed a model whereby the incidence of cancers increases linearly with effective dose at a rate of 5.5% per sievert. This model is widely accepted for external radiation, but its application to internal contamination has been disputed. This model fails to account for the low rates of cancer in early workers at Los Alamos National Laboratory who were exposed to plutonium dust, and the high rates of thyroid cancer in children following the Chernobyl accident. The informal European Committee on Radiation Risk has questioned the ICRP model used for internal exposure. However a UK National Radiological Protection Board report endorses the ICRP approaches to the estimation of doses and risks from internal emitters and agrees with CERRIE conclusions that these should be best estimates and that associated uncertainties should receive more attention.

The true relationship between committed dose and cancer is almost certainly non-linear. For example, iodine-131 is notable in that high doses of the isotope are sometimes less dangerous than low doses, since they tend to kill thyroid tissues that would otherwise become cancerous as a result of the radiation. Most studies of very-high-dose I-131 for treatment of Graves' disease have failed to find any increase in thyroid cancer, even though there is linear increase in thyroid cancer risk with I-131 absorption at moderate doses.

Internal exposure of the public is controlled by regulatory limits on the radioactive content of food and water. These limits are typically expressed in becquerel/kilogram, with different limits set for each contaminant.

Intake of very large amounts of radioactive material can cause acute radiation syndrome (ARS) in rare instances. Examples include the Alexander Litvinenko poisoning and Leide das Neves Ferreira. While there is no doubt that internal contamination was the cause of ARS in these cases, there is not enough data to establish what quantities of committed dose might cause ARS symptoms. In most scenarios where ARS is a concern, the external effective radiation dose is usually much more hazardous than the internal dose. Normally, the greatest concern with internal exposure is that the radioactive material may stay in the body for an extended period of time, "committing" the subject to accumulating dose long after the initial exposure has ceased. Over a hundred people, including Eben Byers and the radium girls, have received committed doses in excess of 10 Gy and went on to die of cancer or natural causes, whereas the same amount of acute external dose would invariably cause an earlier death by ARS.

== Examples ==
Below are a series of examples of internal exposure.

- Thorotrast
- The exposure caused by Potassium-40 present within a normal person.
- The exposure to the ingestion of a soluble radioactive substance, such as ^{89}Sr in cows' milk.
- A person who is being treated for cancer by means of an unsealed source radiotherapy method where a radioisotope is used as a drug (usually a liquid or pill). A review of this topic was published in 1999. Because the radioactive material becomes intimately mixed with the affected object it is often difficult to decontaminate the object or person in a case where internal exposure is occurring. While some very insoluble materials such as fission products within a uranium dioxide matrix might never be able to truly become part of an organism, it is normal to consider such particles in the lungs and digestive tract as a form of internal contamination which results in internal exposure.
- Boron neutron capture therapy (BNCT) involves injecting a boron-10 tagged chemical that preferentially binds to tumor cells. Neutrons from a nuclear reactor are shaped by a neutron moderator to the neutron energy spectrum suitable for BNCT treatment. The tumor is selectively bombarded with these neutrons. The neutrons quickly slow down in the body to become low energy thermal neutrons. These thermal neutrons are captured by the injected boron-10, forming excited (boron-11) which breaks down into lithium-7 and a helium-4 alpha particle both of these produce closely spaced ionizing radiation. This concept is described as a binary system using two separate components for the therapy of cancer. Each component in itself is relatively harmless to the cells, but when combined for treatment they produce a highly cytocidal (cytotoxic) effect which is lethal (within a limited range of 5-9 micrometers or approximately one cell diameter). Clinical trials, with promising results, are currently carried out in Finland and Japan.

== Related quantities ==
The US Nuclear Regulatory commission defines some non-SI quantities for the calculation of committed dose for use only within the US regulatory system. They carry different names to those used within the International ICRP radiation protection system, thus:

- Committed dose equivalent (CDE) is the equivalent dose received by a particular organ or tissue from an internal source, without weighting for tissue sensitivity. This is essentially an intermediate calculation result that cannot be directly compared to final dosimetry quantities
- Committed effective dose equivalent (CEDE) as defined in Title 10, Section 20.1003, of the Code of Federal Regulations of the USA the CEDE dose (HE,50) is the sum of the products of the committed dose equivalents for each of the body organs or tissues that are irradiated multiplied by the weighting factors (WT) applicable to each of those organs or tissues.

Confusion between US and ICRP dose quantity systems can arise because the use of the term "dose equivalent" has been used within the ICRP system since 1991 only for quantities calculated using the value of Q (Linear energy transfer - LET), which the ICRP calls "operational quantities". However within the US NRC system "dose equivalent" is still used to name quantities which are calculated with tissue and radiation weighting factors, which in the ICRP system are now known as the "protection quantities" which are called "effective dose" and "equivalent dose".

== See also ==
- Internal dosimetry
- Radioactivity
- Ionizing radiation
- Collective dose
- Total effective dose equivalent
- Cumulative dose
- Committed dose equivalent
