= Deep-dose equivalent =

The Deep-dose equivalent (DDE) is a measure of external radiation exposure defined by US regulations. It is reported alongside eye and shallow dose equivalents on typical US dosimetry reports. It represents the dose equivalent at a tissue depth of 1 cm (1000 mg/cm2) due to external whole-body exposure to ionizing radiation.

Dose due to external radiation tends to decrease with depth because of the shielding effects of outer tissues. The reference depth of 1 cm essentially discounts alpha and beta radiation that are easily shielded by the skin, clothing, and bone surface, while taking minimal credit for any self-shielding from the more penetrating gamma rays. This makes the deep-dose equivalent a conservative measure of internal organ exposure to external radiation, while eye and skin exposure to external radiation must be accounted differently. Deep-dose equivalent does include any contribution from internal contamination.

== See also ==
- Radioactivity
- Radiation poisoning
- Ionizing radiation
- Dosimetry
- Absorbed dose
- Total effective dose equivalent
- Collective dose
- Cumulative dose
- Committed dose equivalent
- Committed effective dose equivalent
