= Tede =

Tede may refer to:

== People ==
- Tede (rapper) (born 1976), Polish rapper

== Places ==
- Tede, Atisbo, Nigeria

== Other ==
- Total effective dose equivalent, radiation dosimetry quantity
