= Roentgen equivalent man =

Radiation unit

roentgen equivalent man
- Unit system: CGS units
- Unit of: Health effect of ionizing radiation
- Symbol: rem
- Named after: roentgen

Conversions
| 1 rem in ... | ... is equal to ... |
- SI base units: m^{2}⋅s^{−2}
- SI derived unit: 0.01 Sv

The roentgen equivalent man (rem) is a CGS unit of equivalent dose, effective dose, and committed dose, which are dose measures used to estimate potential health effects of low levels of ionizing radiation on the human body.

Quantities measured in rem are designed to represent the stochastic biological risk of ionizing radiation, which is primarily radiation-induced cancer. These quantities are derived from absorbed dose, which in the CGS system has the unit rad. There is no universally applicable conversion constant from rad to rem; the conversion depends on relative biological effectiveness (RBE).

The rem has been defined since 1976 as equal to 0.01 sievert, which is the more commonly used SI unit outside the United States. Earlier definitions going back to 1945 were derived from the roentgen unit, which was named after Wilhelm Röntgen, a German scientist who discovered X-rays. The unit name is misleading, since 1 roentgen actually deposits about 0.96 rem in soft biological tissue, when all weighting factors equal unity. Older units of rem following other definitions are up to 17% smaller than the modern rem.

Doses greater than 100 rem received over a short time period are likely to cause acute radiation syndrome (ARS), possibly leading to death within weeks if left untreated. Note that the quantities that are measured in rem were not designed to be correlated to ARS symptoms. The absorbed dose, measured in rad, is a better indicator of ARS.

A rem is a large dose of radiation, so the millirem (mrem), which is one thousandth of a rem, is often used for the dosages commonly encountered, such as the amount of radiation received from medical X-rays and background sources.

Relation between some ionizing radiation units

== Usage ==
The rem and millirem are CGS units in widest use among the U.S. public, industry, and government. However, the SI unit, the sievert (Sv), is the normal unit outside the United States, and is increasingly encountered within the US in academic, scientific, and engineering environments; it has now virtually replaced the rem.

The conventional unit for dose rate is millirem per hour (mrem/h). Regulatory limits and chronic doses are often given in units of mrem/yr or rem/yr, where they are understood to represent the total amount of radiation allowed (or received) over the entire year. In many occupational scenarios, the hourly dose rate might fluctuate to levels thousands of times higher for a brief period of time, without infringing on the annual total exposure limits. The annual conversions to a Julian year are:

1 mrem/h = 8,766 mrem/yr
0.1141 mrem/h = 1,000 mrem/yr

The International Commission on Radiological Protection (ICRP) once adopted fixed conversion for occupational exposure, although these have not appeared in recent documents:

8 h = 1 day
40 h = 1 week
50 week = 1 yr

Therefore, for occupation exposures of that time period,

1 mrem/h = 2,000 mrem/yr
0.5 mrem/h = 1,000 mrem/yr

The U.S. National Institute of Standards and Technology (NIST) strongly discourages Americans from expressing doses in rem, in favor of recommending the SI unit. The NIST recommends defining the rem in relation to the SI in every document where this unit is used.

== Health effects ==
Ionizing radiation has deterministic and stochastic effects on human health. The deterministic effects that can lead to acute radiation syndrome only occur in the case of high doses (> ~10 rad or > 0.1 Gy) and high dose rates (> ~10 rad/h or > 0.1 Gy/h). A model of deterministic risk would require different weighting factors (not yet established) than are used in the calculation of equivalent and effective dose. To avoid confusion, deterministic effects are normally compared to absorbed dose in units of rad, not rem.

Stochastic effects are those that occur randomly, such as radiation-induced cancer. The consensus of the nuclear industry, nuclear regulators, and governments, is that the incidence of cancers caused by ionizing radiation can be modeled as increasing linearly with effective dose at a rate of 0.055% per rem (5.5%/Sv). Individual studies, alternate models, and earlier versions of the industry consensus have produced other risk estimates scattered around this consensus model. There is general agreement that the risk is much higher for infants and fetuses than adults, higher for the middle-aged than for seniors, and higher for women than for men, though there is no quantitative consensus about this. There is much less data, and much more controversy, regarding the possibility of cardiac and teratogenic effects, and the modelling of internal dose.

The ICRP recommends limiting artificial irradiation of the public to an average of 100 mrem (1 mSv) of effective dose per year, not including medical and occupational exposures. For comparison, radiation levels inside the United States Capitol are 85 mrem/yr (0.85 mSv/yr), close to the regulatory limit, because of the uranium content of the granite structure. The NRC sets the annual total effective dose of full body radiation, or total body radiation (TBR), allowed for radiation workers 5,000 mrem (5 rem).

== History ==
The concept of the rem first appeared in literature in 1945 and was given its first definition in 1947. The definition was refined in 1950 as "that dose of any ionizing radiation which produces a relevant biological effect equal to that produced by one roentgen of high-voltage x-radiation." Using data available at the time, the rem was variously evaluated as 83, 93, or 95 ergs per gram (erg/g). Along with the introduction of the rad in 1953, the ICRP decided to continue the use of the rem. The US National Committee on Radiation Protection and Measurements noted in 1954 that this effectively implied an increase in the magnitude of the rem to match the rad (100 erg/g). The ICRP introduced and then officially adopted the rem in 1962 as the unit of equivalent dose to measure the way different types of radiation distribute energy in tissue and began recommending values of relative biological effectiveness (RBE) for various types of radiation. In practice, the unit of rem was used to denote that an RBE factor had been applied to a number which was originally in units of rad or roentgen.

The International Committee for Weights and Measures (CIPM) adopted the sievert in 1980 but never accepted the use of the rem. The NIST recognizes that this unit is outside the SI but temporarily accepts its use in the U.S. with the SI. The rem remains in widespread use as an industry standard in the U.S. The United States Nuclear Regulatory Commission still permits the use of the units curie, rad, and rem alongside SI units.

== Radiation-related quantities ==
The following table shows radiation quantities in SI and non-SI units:

Ionizing radiation related quantities
| Quantity | Unit | Symbol | Derivation | Year | SI equivalent |
|---|---|---|---|---|---|
| Activity (A) | becquerel | Bq | s^{−1} | 1974 | SI unit |
| Activity (A) | curie | Ci | 3.7×10^{10} s^{−1} | 1953 | 3.7×10^{10} Bq |
| Activity (A) | rutherford | Rd | 10^{6} s^{−1} | 1946 | 1000000 Bq |
| Exposure (X) | coulomb per kilogram | C/kg | C⋅kg^{−1} of air | 1974 | SI unit |
| Exposure (X) | röntgen | R | esu / 0.001293 g of air | 1928 | 2.58×10^{−4} C/kg |
| Absorbed dose (D) | gray | Gy | J⋅kg^{−1} | 1974 | SI unit |
| Absorbed dose (D) | erg per gram | erg/g | erg⋅g^{−1} | 1950 | 1.0×10^{−4} Gy |
| Absorbed dose (D) | rad | rad | 100 erg⋅g^{−1} | 1953 | 0.010 Gy |
| Equivalent dose (H) | sievert | Sv | J⋅kg^{−1} × W_{R} | 1977 | SI unit |
| Equivalent dose (H) | röntgen equivalent man | rem | 100 erg⋅g^{−1} × W_{R} | 1971 | 0.010 Sv |
| Effective dose (E) | sievert | Sv | J⋅kg^{−1} × W_{R} × W_{T} | 1977 | SI unit |
| Effective dose (E) | röntgen equivalent man | rem | 100 erg⋅g^{−1} × W_{R} × W_{T} | 1971 | 0.010 Sv |

== See also ==
- Roentgen equivalent physical
- Banana equivalent dose
- Health threat from cosmic rays
- Orders of magnitude (radiation)
