= Beta particle =

Ionizing radiation

Alpha radiation consists of helium nuclei and is readily stopped by a sheet of paper. Beta radiation, consisting of electrons or positrons, is stopped by a thin aluminium plate, but gamma radiation requires shielding by dense material such as lead or concrete.

A beta particle, also called beta ray or beta radiation (symbol β), is a high-energy, high-speed electron or positron emitted by the radioactive decay of an atomic nucleus, known as beta decay. There are two forms of beta decay, β^{−} decay and β^{+} decay, which produce electrons and positrons, respectively.

Beta particles with an energy of 0.5 MeV have a range of about one metre in the air, and can't pass through clothing or thin metal sheets; the distance is dependent on the particle's energy and the air's density and composition.

Beta particles are a type of ionizing radiation, and for radiation protection purposes, they are regarded as being more ionizing than gamma rays, but less ionizing than alpha particles. The higher the ionising effect, the greater the damage to living tissue, but also the lower the penetrating power of the radiation through matter. The ionising effect of a beta particle is caused by the particle knocking electrons from shells by either the electrostatic force or energy transfer from the beta particle to the electron by collision. They produce roughly 100 ion pairs per cm in air, this means an ion plus a released electron.

== Beta decay modes ==
=== β^{−} decay (electron emission) ===
Beta decay A beta particle (in this case a negative electron) is shown being emitted by a nucleus. An antineutrino (not shown) is always emitted along with an electron. Insert: in the decay of a free neutron, a proton, an electron (negative beta ray), and an electron antineutrino are produced.

An unstable atomic nucleus with an excess of neutrons may undergo β^{−} decay, where a neutron is converted into a proton, an electron, and an electron antineutrino (the antiparticle of the neutrino):

n → p + e^{−} + ν̅_{e}

This process is mediated by the weak interaction. The neutron turns into a proton through the emission of a virtual W^{−} boson. At the quark level, W^{−} emission turns a down quark into an up quark, turning a neutron (one up quark and two down quarks) into a proton (two up quarks and one down quark). The virtual W^{−} boson then decays into an electron and an antineutrino. A known example of this is the decay of hydrogen-3:

$\ce{{}^{3}\ \text{T} \stackrel{{\beta}^{-}}{\longrightarrow} {}^{3}\ \text{He}^{+} + e^+ + \overline{v}_{e}}$

β− decay commonly occurs among the neutron-rich fission byproducts produced in nuclear reactors. Free neutrons also decay via this process. Both of these processes contribute to the copious quantities of beta rays and electron antineutrinos produced by fission-reactor fuel rods.

=== β^{+} decay (positron emission) ===
Unstable atomic nuclei with an excess of protons may undergo β^{+} decay, also called positron decay, where a proton is converted into a neutron, a positron, and an electron neutrino:

p → n + e^{+} + ν_{e}

Beta-plus decay can only happen inside nuclei when the absolute value of the binding energy of the daughter nucleus is greater than that of the parent nucleus, i.e., the daughter nucleus is a lower-energy state.

=== Beta decay schemes ===
Caesium-137 decay scheme, showing it initially undergoes beta decay. The 661 keV gamma peak associated with ^{137}Cs is actually emitted by the daughter radionucide.

The accompanying decay scheme diagram shows the beta decay of caesium-137. ^{137}Cs is noted for a characteristic gamma peak at 661 keV, but this is actually emitted by the daughter radionuclide ^{137m}Ba. The diagram shows the type and energy of the emitted radiation, its relative abundance, and the daughter nuclides after decay.

Phosphorus-32 is a beta emitter widely used in medicine. It has a short half-life of 14.29 days and decays into sulfur-32 by beta decay as shown in this nuclear equation:

^{32}_{15}P	→	^{32}_{16}S^{1+}	+	e^{−}	+	ν̅_{e}

1.709 MeV of energy is released during the decay. The kinetic energy of the electron varies with an average of approximately 0.5 MeV and the remainder of the energy is carried by the nearly undetectable electron antineutrino. In comparison to other beta radiation-emitting nuclides, the electron is moderately energetic. It is blocked by around 1 m of air or 5 mm of acrylic glass.

== Interaction with other matter ==
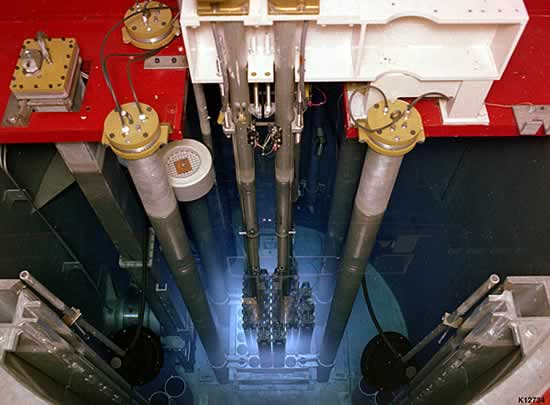
Blue Cherenkov radiation light being emitted from a TRIGA reactor pool is due to high-speed beta particles traveling faster than the speed of light (phase velocity) in water (which is 75% of the speed of light in vacuum).

Of the three common types of radiation given off by radioactive materials, alpha, beta and gamma, beta has the medium penetrating power and the medium ionising power. Although the beta particles given off by different radioactive materials vary in energy, most beta particles can be stopped by a few millimeters of aluminium. However, this does not mean that beta-emitting isotopes can be completely shielded by such thin shields: as they decelerate in matter, beta electrons emit secondary gamma rays, which are more penetrating than betas per se. Shielding composed of materials with lower atomic weight generates gammas with lower energy, making such shields somewhat more effective per unit mass than ones made of larger atoms such as lead.

Being composed of charged particles, beta radiation is more strongly ionizing than gamma radiation. When passing through matter, a beta particle is decelerated by electromagnetic interactions and may give off bremsstrahlung X-rays.

In water, beta radiation from many nuclear fission products typically exceeds the speed of light in that material (which is about 75% that of light in vacuum), and thus generates blue Cherenkov radiation when it passes through water. The intense beta radiation from the fuel rods of swimming pool reactors can thus be visualized through the transparent water that covers and shields the reactor (see illustration at right).

=== Detection and measurement ===
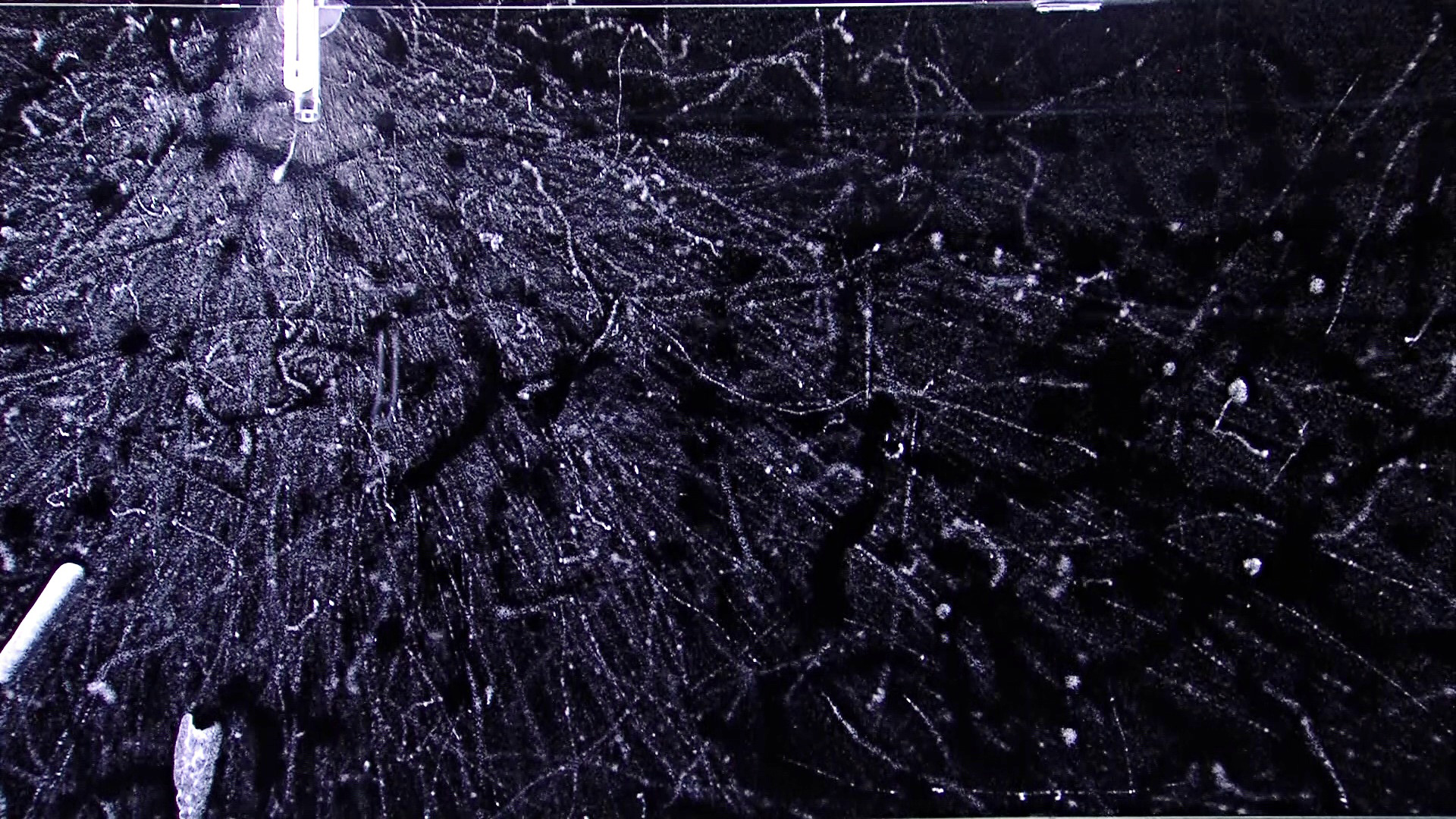
Beta radiation detected in an isopropanol cloud chamber (after insertion of an artificial source strontium-90)

The ionizing or excitation effects of beta particles on matter are the fundamental processes by which radiometric detection instruments detect and measure beta radiation. The ionization of gas is used in ion chambers and Geiger–Müller counters, and the excitation of scintillators is used in scintillation counters. The following table shows radiation quantities in SI and non-SI units:

Ionizing radiation related quantities
Quantity	Unit	Symbol	Derivation	Year	SI equivalent
Activity (A)	becquerel	Bq	s^{−1}	1974	SI unit
Activity (A)	curie	Ci	3.7×10^{10} s^{−1}	1953	3.7×10^{10} Bq
Activity (A)	rutherford	Rd	10^{6} s^{−1}	1946	1000000 Bq
Exposure (X)	coulomb per kilogram	C/kg	C⋅kg^{−1} of air	1974	SI unit
Exposure (X)	röntgen	R	esu / 0.001293 g of air	1928	2.58×10^{−4} C/kg
Absorbed dose (D)	gray	Gy	J⋅kg^{−1}	1974	SI unit
Absorbed dose (D)	erg per gram	erg/g	erg⋅g^{−1}	1950	1.0×10^{−4} Gy
Absorbed dose (D)	rad	rad	100 erg⋅g^{−1}	1953	0.010 Gy
Equivalent dose (H)	sievert	Sv	J⋅kg^{−1} × W_{R}	1977	SI unit
Equivalent dose (H)	röntgen equivalent man	rem	100 erg⋅g^{−1} × W_{R}	1971	0.010 Sv
Effective dose (E)	sievert	Sv	J⋅kg^{−1} × W_{R} × W_{T}	1977	SI unit
Effective dose (E)	röntgen equivalent man	rem	100 erg⋅g^{−1} × W_{R} × W_{T}	1971	0.010 Sv

- The gray (Gy) is the SI unit of absorbed dose, which is the amount of radiation energy deposited in the irradiated material. For beta radiation this is numerically equal to the equivalent dose measured by the sievert, which indicates the stochastic biological effect of low levels of radiation on human tissue. The radiation weighting conversion factor from absorbed dose to equivalent dose is 1 for beta, whereas alpha particles have a factor of 20, reflecting their greater ionising effect on tissue.
- The rad is the deprecated CGS unit for absorbed dose and the rem is the deprecated CGS unit of equivalent dose, used mainly in the USA.

=== Beta spectroscopy ===
The energy contained within individual beta particles is measured via beta spectrometry; the study of the obtained distribution of energies as a spectrum is beta spectroscopy. Determination of this energy is done by measuring the amount of deflection of the electron's path under a magnetic field.

== Applications ==
Beta particles can be used to treat health conditions such as eye and bone cancer and are also used as tracers. Strontium-90 is the material most commonly used to produce beta particles.

Beta particles are also used in quality control to test the thickness of an item, such as paper, coming through a system of rollers. Some of the beta radiation is absorbed while passing through the product. If the product is made too thick or thin, a correspondingly different amount of radiation will be absorbed. A computer program monitoring the quality of the manufactured paper will then move the rollers to change the thickness of the final product.

An illumination device called a betalight contains tritium and a phosphor. As tritium decays, it emits beta particles; these strike the phosphor, causing the phosphor to give off photons, much like the cathode-ray tube in a television. The illumination requires no external power, and will continue as long as the tritium exists (and the phosphors do not themselves chemically change); the amount of light produced will drop to half its original value in 12.32 years, the half-life of tritium.

Beta-plus (or positron) decay of a radioactive tracer isotope is the source of the positrons used in positron emission tomography (PET scan).

== History ==
Henri Becquerel, while experimenting with fluorescence, accidentally found out that uranium exposed a photographic plate, wrapped with black paper, with some unknown radiation that could not be turned off like X-rays.

Ernest Rutherford continued these experiments and discovered two different kinds of radiation:

- alpha particles that did not show up on the Becquerel plates because they were easily absorbed by the black wrapping paper
- beta particles which are 100 times more penetrating than alpha particles.

He published his results in 1899.

In 1900, Becquerel measured the mass-to-charge ratio (m/e) for beta particles by the method of J. J. Thomson used to study cathode rays and identify the electron. He found that e/m for a beta particle is the same as for Thomson's electron, and therefore suggested that the beta particle is in fact an electron.

In 1948, the couple Maurice Goldhaber and Gertrude Scharff Goldhaber devised an experiment to further confirm that the beta particle is identical to the electron, based on the Pauli exclusion principle. They fired a beam of beta particles at a lead sample. If beta particles were different from electrons, beta particles would share orbits with electrons, and emit X-rays of a specific frequency as they cascaded to lower orbits. This emission did not occur meaning that beta particles could not share orbits with electrons.

== Health ==
Beta particles are moderately penetrating in living tissue, and can cause spontaneous mutation in DNA.

Beta sources can be used in radiation therapy to kill cancer cells.

== See also ==
- Common beta emitters
- Electron irradiation
- Particle physics
- n (neutron) rays
- δ (delta) rays
