= Effective dose (radiation) =

Probability of ill health effects from ionizing radiation

Effective dose is a dose quantity in the International Commission on Radiological Protection (ICRP) system of radiological protection. It is the tissue-weighted sum of the equivalent doses in all specified tissues and organs of the human body. It represents the stochastic health risk to the whole body, which is the probability of cancer induction and genetic effects, of low levels of ionizing radiation. It takes into account the type of radiation and the nature of each organ or tissue being irradiated (becoming radioactive), and enables summation of organ doses due to varying levels and types of radiation, both internal and external, to produce an overall calculated effective dose.

The SI unit for effective dose is the sievert (Sv) which corresponds to a 5.5% chance of developing cancer. The effective dose is not intended as a measure of deterministic health effects, which is the severity of acute tissue damage that is certain to happen, that is measured by the quantity absorbed dose.

The concept of effective dose was developed by Wolfgang Jacobi and published in 1975, and was so convincing that the ICRP incorporated it into their 1977 general recommendations (publication 26) as "effective dose equivalent". The name "effective dose" replaced the name "effective dose equivalent" in 1991. Since 1977 it has been the central quantity for dose limitation in the ICRP international system of radiological protection.

== Uses ==
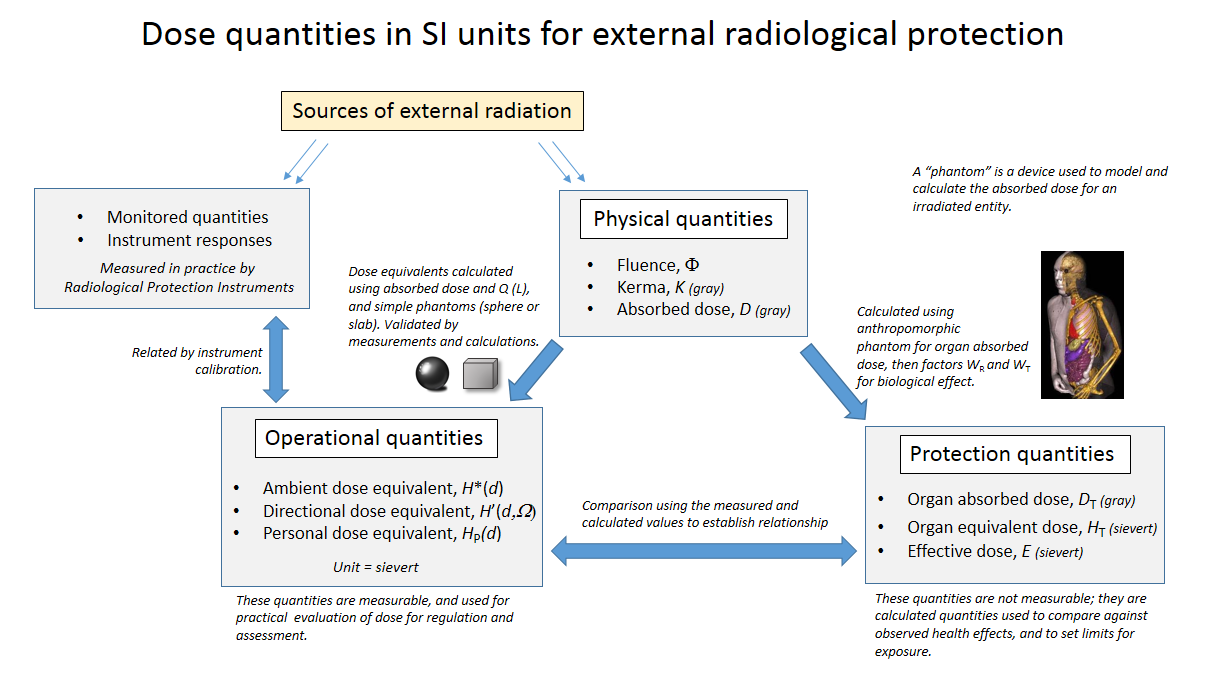
External dose quantities used in radiation protection and dosimetry

According to the ICRP, the main uses of effective dose are the prospective dose assessment for planning and optimisation in radiological protection, and demonstration of compliance with dose limits for regulatory purposes. The effective dose is thus a central dose quantity for regulatory purposes.

The ICRP also says that effective dose has made a significant contribution to radiological protection as it has enabled doses to be summed from whole and partial body exposure from external radiation of various types and from intakes of radionuclides.

=== Usage for external dose ===
The calculation of effective dose is required for partial or non-uniform irradiation of the human body because equivalent dose does not consider the tissue irradiated, but only the radiation type. Various body tissues react to ionising radiation in different ways, so the ICRP has assigned sensitivity factors to specified tissues and organs so that the effect of partial irradiation can be calculated if the irradiated regions are known. A radiation field irradiating only a portion of the body will carry lower risk than if the same field irradiated the whole body. To take this into account, the effective doses to the component parts of the body which have been irradiated are calculated and summed. This becomes the effective dose for the whole body, dose quantity E. It is a "protection" dose quantity which can be calculated, but cannot be measured in practice.

An effective dose will carry the same effective risk to the whole body regardless of where it was applied, and it will carry the same effective risk as the same amount of equivalent dose applied uniformly to the whole body.

=== Usage for internal dose ===
Effective dose can be calculated for committed dose which is the internal dose resulting from inhaling, ingesting, or injecting radioactive materials. The dose quantity used is:

Committed effective dose, E(t), is "the sum of the products of the committed organ or tissue equivalent doses and the appropriate tissue weighting factors W_{T}, where t is the integration time in years following the intake. The commitment period is taken to be 50 years for adults, and to age 70 years for children."

== Calculation of effective dose ==
Relation between some ionizing radiation units

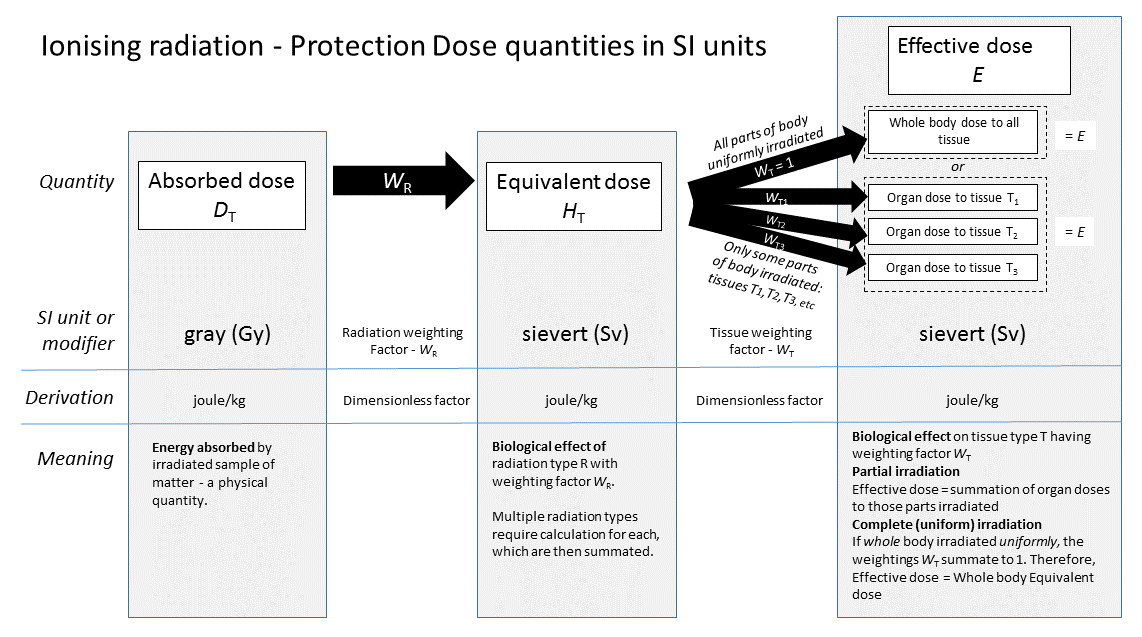
Graphic showing relationships of protection dose quantities in SI units

Ionizing radiation deposits energy in the matter being irradiated. The quantity used to express this is absorbed dose, which is dependent on the intensity and type of the incident radiation as well as the absorption properties of the irradiated object. Absorbed dose is a physical quantity, and is not a satisfactory indicator of biological effect, so to allow for the consideration of stochastic radiological risk, the weighted dose quantities equivalent dose (or dose equivalent) and effective dose were devised by the International Commission on Radiation Units and Measurements (ICRU) and the ICRP to assess the biological effect of an absorbed dose.

To obtain an effective dose, the calculated absorbed organ dose $D_\text{T}$ is first corrected for the radiation type using factor $W_\text{R}$ to give a weighted average of the equivalent dose $H_\text{T}$ received by irradiated body tissues. This result is further corrected for the tissues or organs being irradiated using a weighting factor $W_\text{T}$ to produce the effective dose quantity $E$.

The sum of effective doses to all organs and tissues of the body represents the effective dose for the whole body. If only part of the body is irradiated, then only those regions are used to calculate the effective dose. The tissue weighting factors add to 1.00 (or 100%), so that if an entire body is exposed to a uniform external radiation field, the effective dose is equal to the equivalent dose for the entire body.

=== Use of tissue weighting factors ===
Tissues such as bone marrow are particularly sensitive to radiation, and as such they are given a weighting factor that is disproportionately large relative to the fraction of body mass they represent. Other tissues such as the hard bone surface are particularly insensitive to radiation and therefore are assigned a disproportionately low weighting factor. These weighting factors for different tissues are given in the accompanying table.

Weighting factors for different tissues
Organs	Tissue weighting factors		
Organs	ICRP26 1977	ICRP60 1990	ICRP103 2007
Gonads	0.25	0.20	0.08
Red Bone Marrow	0.12	0.12	0.12
Colon	–	0.12	0.12
Lung	0.12	0.12	0.12
Stomach	–	0.12	0.12
Breasts	0.15	0.05	0.12
Bladder	–	0.05	0.04
Liver	–	0.05	0.04
Oesophagus	–	0.05	0.04
Thyroid	0.03	0.05	0.04
Skin	–	0.01	0.01
Bone surface	0.03	0.01	0.01
Salivary glands	–	–	0.01
Brain	–	–	0.01
Remainder of body	0.30	0.05	0.12
Total	1.00	1.00	1.00

Calculating from the equivalent dose:

$$E = \sum_T W_T \cdot H_T = \sum_T W_T \sum_R W_R \cdot \overline{D}_{T,R}$$.

Calculating from the absorbed dose:

$$E = \sum_T W_T \sum_R W_R \cdot \frac{\displaystyle \int_{T}D_R (x,y,z)\rho(x,y,z)dV}{\displaystyle \int_{T}\rho(x,y,z)dV}$$

Where

$E$ is the effective dose to the entire organism
$H_T$ is the equivalent dose absorbed by tissue T
$W_T$ is the tissue weighting factor defined by regulation
$W_R$ is the radiation weighting factor defined by regulation
$\overline{D}_{T,R}$ is the mass-averaged absorbed dose in tissue T by radiation type R
$D_R (x,y,z)$ is the absorbed dose from radiation type R as a function of location
$\rho(x,y,z)$ is the density as a function of location
$V$ is volume
$T$ is the tissue or organ of interest

The ICRP tissue weighting factors are chosen to represent the fraction of health risk, or biological effect, which is attributable to the specific tissue named. These weighting factors have been revised twice, as shown in the chart above.

The United States Nuclear Regulatory Commission still uses the ICRP's 1977 tissue weighting factors in their regulations, despite the ICRP's later revised recommendations.

== By medical imaging type ==
Effective dose by medical imaging type
Target organs	Exam type	Effective dose in adults	Equivalent time of background radiation
CT of the head	Single series	2 mSv	8 months
CT of the head	With + without radiocontrast	4 mSv	16 months
Chest	CT of the chest	7 mSv	2 years
Chest	CT of the chest, lung cancer screening protocol	1.5 mSv	6 months
Chest	Chest X-ray	0.1 mSv	10 days
Heart	Coronary CT angiography	12 mSv	4 years
Heart	Coronary CT calcium scan	3 mSv	1 year
Abdominal	CT of abdomen and pelvis	10 mSv	3 years
Abdominal	CT of abdomen and pelvis, low dose protocol	3 mSv	1 year
Abdominal	CT of abdomen and pelvis, with + without radiocontrast	20 mSv	7 years
Abdominal	CT Colonography	6 mSv	2 years
Abdominal	Intravenous pyelogram	3 mSv	1 year
Abdominal	Upper gastrointestinal series	6 mSv	2 years
Abdominal	Lower gastrointestinal series	8 mSv	3 years
Spine	Spine X-ray	1.5 mSv	6 months
Spine	CT of the spine	6 mSv	2 years
Extremities	X-ray of extremity	0.001 mSv	3 hours
Extremities	Lower extremity CT angiography	0.3 - 1.6 mSv	5 weeks - 6 months
Dental X-ray		0.005 mSv	1 day
DEXA (bone density)		0.001 mSv	3 hours
PET-CT combination		25 mSv	8 years
Mammography		0.4 mSv	7 weeks

== Health effects ==
Ionizing radiation is generally harmful and potentially lethal to living things but can have health benefits in radiation therapy for the treatment of cancer and thyrotoxicosis. Its most common impact is the induction of cancer with a latent period of years or decades after exposure. High doses can cause visually dramatic radiation burns, and/or rapid fatality through acute radiation syndrome. Controlled doses are used for medical imaging and radiotherapy.

== Regulatory nomenclature ==
=== UK regulations ===
The UK Ionising Radiations Regulations 1999 defines its usage of the term effective dose; "Any reference to an effective dose means the sum of the effective dose to the whole body from external radiation and the committed effective dose from internal radiation."

=== US effective dose equivalent ===
The US Nuclear Regulatory Commission has retained in the US regulation system the older term effective dose equivalent to refer to a similar quantity to the ICRP effective dose. The NRC's total effective dose equivalent (TEDE) is the sum of external effective dose with internal committed dose; in other words all sources of dose.

In the US, cumulative equivalent dose due to external whole-body exposure is normally reported to nuclear energy workers in regular dosimetry reports.

- deep-dose equivalent, (DDE) which is properly a whole-body equivalent dose
- shallow dose equivalent, (SDE) which is actually the effective dose to the skin

== History ==
The concept of effective dose was introduced in 1975 by Wolfgang Jacobi (1928–2015) in his publication "The concept of an effective dose: a proposal for the combination of organ doses". It was quickly included in 1977 as “effective dose equivalent” into Publication 26 by the ICRP. In 1991, ICRP publication 60 shortened the name to "effective dose." This quantity is sometimes incorrectly referred to as the "dose equivalent" because of the earlier name, and that misnomer in turn causes confusion with equivalent dose. The tissue weighting factors were revised in 1990 and 2007 due to new data.

== Future use of Effective Dose ==
At the ICRP 3rd International Symposium on the System of Radiological Protection in October 2015, ICRP Task Group 79 reported on the "Use of Effective Dose as a Risk-related Radiological Protection Quantity".

This included a proposal to discontinue use of equivalent dose as a separate protection quantity. This would avoid confusion between equivalent dose, effective dose and dose equivalent, and to use absorbed dose in Gy as a more appropriate quantity for limiting deterministic effects to the eye lens, skin, hands & feet.

It was also proposed that effective dose could be used as a rough indicator of possible risk from medical examinations. These proposals will need to go through the following stages:

- Discussion within ICRP Committees
- Revision of report by Task Group
- Reconsideration by Committees and Main Commission
- Public Consultation

== See also ==
- Radioactivity
- Collective dose
- Total effective dose equivalent
- Deep-dose equivalent
- Dose area product
- Cumulative dose
- Committed dose equivalent
- Committed effective dose equivalent
