= Committed dose equivalent =

Committed dose equivalent and Committed effective dose equivalent are dose quantities used in the United States system of radiological protection for irradiation due to an internal source.

== Committed dose equivalent (CDE) ==
CDE is defined by the United States Nuclear Regulatory Commission in Title 10, Section 20.1003, of the Code of Federal Regulations (10 CFR 20.1003), such that "The Committed dose equivalent, CDE (H_{T},50) is the dose to some specific organ or tissue of reference (T) that will be received from an intake of radioactive material by an individual during the 50-year period following the intake".

"The calculation of the committed effective dose equivalent (CEDE) begins with the determination of the equivalent dose, H_{T}, to a tissue or organ, T. Where D_{T},R is the absorbed dose in rads (one gray, an SI unit, equals 100 rads) averaged over the tissue or organ, T, due to radiation type, R, and W_{R} is the radiation weighting factor. The unit of equivalent dose is the rem (sievert, in SI units)."

== Committed effective dose equivalent (CEDE) ==
This is defined in Title 10, Section 20.1003, of the Code of Federal Regulations of the USA the CEDE dose (HE,50) as the sum of the products of the committed dose equivalents for each of the body organs or tissues that are irradiated multiplied by the weighting factors (W_{T}) applicable to each of those organs or tissues.

"The probability of occurrence of a stochastic effect in a tissue or organ is assumed to be proportional to the equivalent dose in the tissue or organ. The constant of proportionality differs for the various tissues of the body, but in assessing health detriment the total risk is required. This is taken into account using the tissue weighting factors, W_{T}, which represent the proportion of the stochastic risk resulting from irradiation of the tissue or organ to the total risk when the whole body is irradiated uniformly and H_{T} is the equivalent dose in the tissue or organ, T, in the equation:"

Committed Effective Dose Equivalent (CEDE) refers to the dose resulting from internal radiation exposures. The CEDE is combined with the Deep-Dose Equivalent (DDE), the dose from external whole body exposures, to produce the Total Effective Dose Equivalent (TEDE), the dose resulting from internal and external radiation exposures.

== Units ==
Both quantities can be expressed in rem or sieverts (Sv).

== Pathways for Exposure ==
The intake of radioactive material can occur through four pathways: inhalation of airborne contaminants such as radon, ingestion of contaminated food or liquids, absorption of vapors such as tritium oxide through the skin, and injection of medical radioisotopes such as technetium-99m.

Some artificial radioisotopes such as iodine-131 are chemically identical to natural isotopes needed by the body, and may be more readily absorbed if the individual has a deficit of that element. For instance, potassium iodide (KI), administered orally immediately after exposure, may be used to protect the thyroid from ingested radioactive iodine in the event of an accident or attack at a nuclear power plant, or the detonation of a nuclear explosive which would release radioactive iodine. Other radioisotopes have an affinity for particular tissues, such as plutonium into bone, and may be retained there for years in spite of their foreign nature.

Not all radiation is harmful. The radiation can be absorbed through multiple pathways, varying due to the circumstances of the situation. If the radioactive material is necessary, it can be ingested orally via stable isotopes of specific elements. This is only suggested to those that have a lack of these elements however, because radioactive material can go from healthy to harmful with very small amounts. The most harmful way to absorb radiation is that of ingestion absorption because it is almost impossible to control how much will enter the body.

== Committed dose equivalent in the practice of radiological protection ==
In the case of internal exposure, the dose is not received at the moment of exposure, as happens with external exposure, since the incorporated radionuclide irradiates the various organs and tissues during the time it is present in the body. By definition, the committed dose equivalent corresponds to the received dose integrated over 50 years from the date of intake. In order to calculate it, one has to know the intake activity and the value of the committed dose equivalent per unit of intake activity. The uncertainties of the first parameter are such that the committed dose equivalent can only be regarded as an order of magnitude and not as a very accurate quantity. The use of it is justified, however, for, like the dose equivalent for external exposure, it expresses the risk of stochastic effects for the individual concerned since these effects, should they appear, would do so only after a latent period which is generally longer than the dose integration time. Moreover, the use of the committed dose equivalent offers certain advantages for dosimetric management, especially when it is simplified. A practical problem which may arise is that the annual dose limit is apparently exceeded by virtue of the fact that one is taking account, in the first year, of doses which will actually be received only in the following years. These problems are rare enough in practice to be dealt with individually in each case.

== Cigarette smoke measured with SSNTD and corresponding committed equivalent dose ==
"Uranium and Thorium contents were measured inside various tobacco samples by using a method based on determining detection efficiencies of the CR-39 and LR-115 II solid state nuclear track detectors (SSNTD) for the emitted alpha particles. Alpha and beta activities per unit volume, due to radon, thoron and their decay products, were evaluated inside cigarette smokes of tobacco samples studied. Annual committed equivalent doses due to short-lived radon decay products from the inhalation of various cigarette smokes were determined in the thoracic and extrathoracic regions of the respiratory tract. Three types of cigarettes made in Morocco of black tobacco show higher annual committed equivalent doses in the extrathoracic and thoracic regions of the respiratory tract than the other studied cigarettes (except one type of cigarettes made in France of yellow tobacco); their corresponding annual committed equivalent dose ratios are larger than 1.8. Measured annual committed equivalent doses ranged from 1.8×10^{−9} Sv/yr to in the extrathoracic region and from 1.3×10^{−10} Sv/yr to in the thoracic region of the respiratory tract for a smoker consuming 20 cigarettes a day."

== See also ==
- Radioactivity
- Radiation poisoning
- Ionizing radiation
- Collective dose
- Cumulative dose
- Committed effective dose equivalent
