= Equivalent dose =

Absorbed dose of ionizing radiation weighted with the quality factor

- Common symbols: H
- SI unit: sievert (Sv)
- Other units: röntgen equivalent man (rem)
- In SI base units: J/kg

Equivalent dose (symbol H) is a dose quantity representing the stochastic health effects of low levels of ionizing radiation on the human body which represents the probability of radiation-induced cancer and genetic damage. It is derived from the physical quantity absorbed dose, but also takes into account the biological effectiveness of the radiation, which is dependent on the radiation type and energy. In the international system of units (SI), its unit of measure is the sievert (Sv).

== Application ==
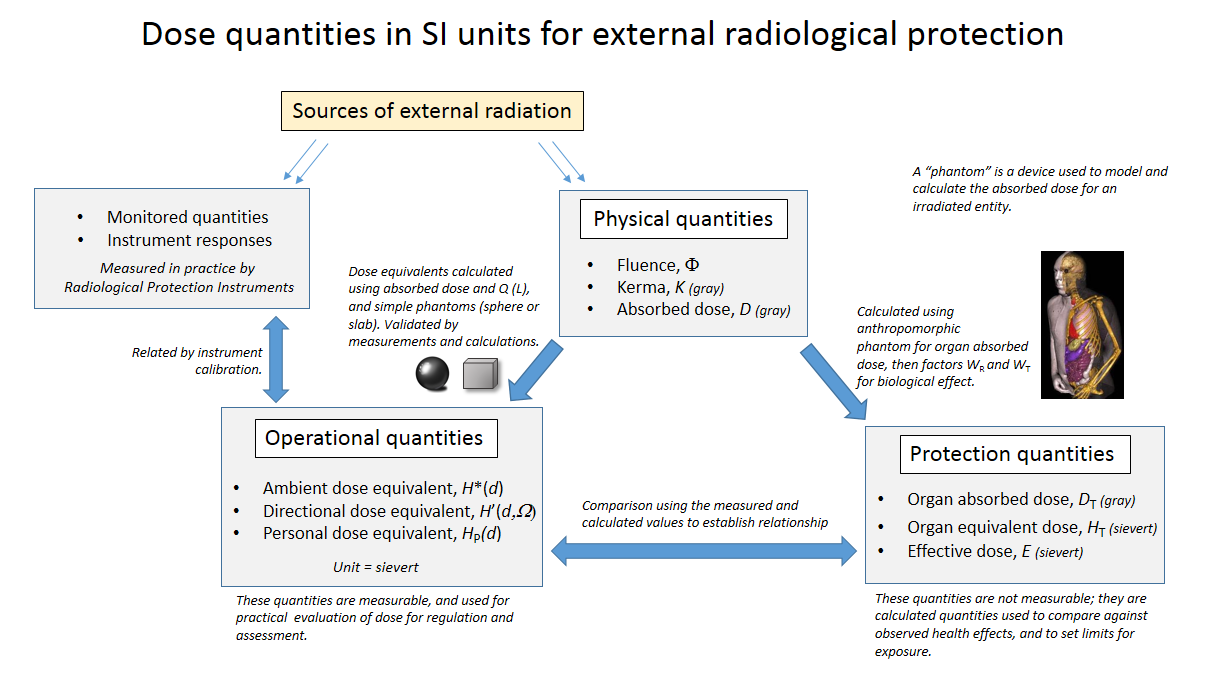
External dose quantities used in radiation protection and dosimetry

To enable consideration of stochastic health risk, calculations are performed to convert the physical quantity absorbed dose into equivalent dose, the details of which depend on the radiation type. For applications in radiation protection and dosimetry assessment, the International Commission on Radiological Protection (ICRP) and the International Commission on Radiation Units and Measurements (ICRU) have published recommendations and data on how to calculate equivalent dose from absorbed dose.

Equivalent dose is designated by the ICRP as a "limiting quantity"; to specify exposure limits to ensure that "the occurrence of stochastic health effects is kept below unacceptable levels and that tissue reactions are avoided". Equivalent dose is a calculated value, as it cannot be practically measured, and the purpose of the calculation is to generate a biologically-weighted absorbed dose value for comparison with observed health effects.

== Calculation ==
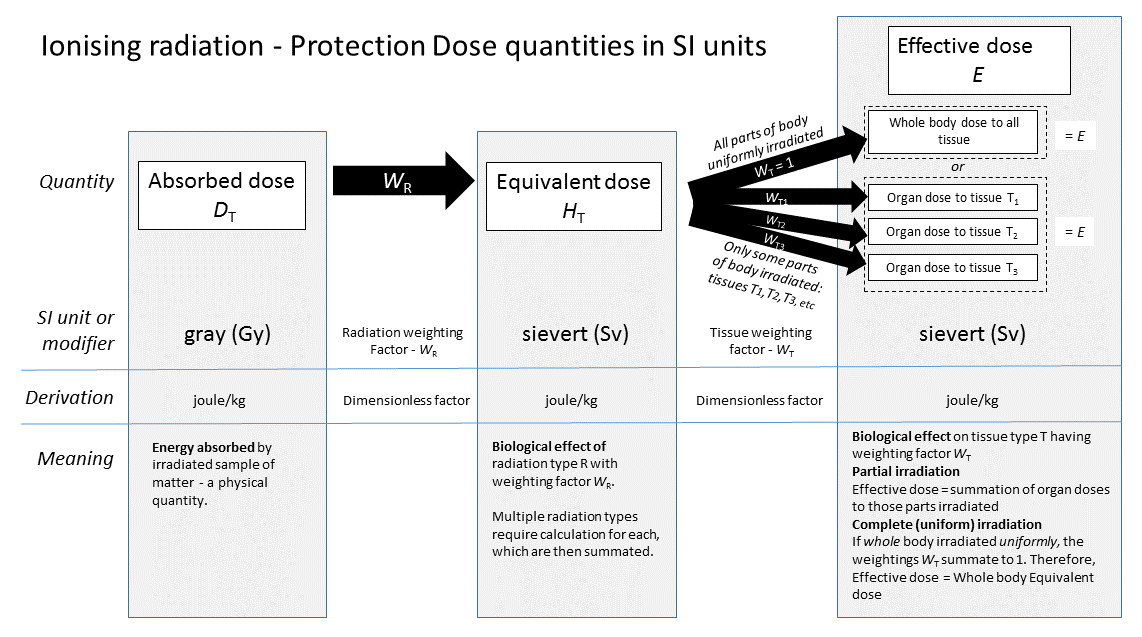
Relationships of SI external "protection" dose quantities

Equivalent dose $H_\text{T}$ is calculated using the mean absorbed dose deposited in body tissue or organ T, multiplied by the radiation weighting factor $W_\text{R}$ (formerly called the quality factor Q), which is dependent on the type and energy of the ionizing radiation R.

The radiation weighting factor represents the relative biological effectiveness of the ionizing radiation; it modifies the absorbed dose to take into account the varying biological effects of various types and energies of ionizing radiation.

The ICRP has assigned radiation weighting factors to specified ionizing radiation types dependent on their relative biological effectiveness, which are shown in the accompanying table.

Radiation weighting factors used to represent relative biological effectiveness according to ICRP report 103
Radiation	Weighting factor W_{R}
X-rays, gamma rays, beta particles, muons	1
neutrons (<1 MeV)	$2.5 + 18.2 \exp(-[\ln E]^2 / 6)$
neutrons (1 - 50 MeV)	$5.0 + 17.0 \exp(-[\ln (2 E)]^2 / 6)$
neutrons (>50 MeV)	$2.5 + 3.25 \exp(-[\ln (0.04 E)]^2 / 6)$
protons, charged pions	2
alpha particles, nuclear fission products, heavy nuclei	20

Equivalent dose is calculated from absorbed dose via:

$$H_\text{T} = \sum_R W_\text{R} D_\text{T,R}$$,

where

- $H_\text{T}$ is the equivalent dose in sieverts (Sv) absorbed by tissue T,
- $D_\text{T,R}$ is the absorbed dose in gray (Gy) in tissue T by radiation type R, and
- $W_\text{R}$ is the radiation weighting factor defined by regulation.

For example, an absorbed dose of 1 Gy by alpha particles will lead to an equivalent dose of 20 Sv. This equivalent dose is estimated to have the same biological effect as an equal amount of absorbed dose by gamma rays, which is assigned a weighting factor of 1.

As given in the above formula, to obtain the equivalent dose for a mixed radiation field (i.e., ionizing radiation of varying types and energies), a sum is taken over all absorbed doses and their accompanying weighting factors. This is intended to take into account the individual biological effects of different ionizing radiation types.

== History ==
The concept of equivalent dose was developed in the 1950s. In its 1990 recommendations, the ICRP revised the definitions of some radiation protection quantities and provided new names for these revised quantities. Some regulators, notably the International Committee for Weights and Measures (CIPM) and the U. S. Nuclear Regulatory Commission continue to use the old terminology of quality factor and dose equivalent, even though the underlying calculations have changed.

== Future use ==
At the ICRP 3rd International Symposium on the System of Radiological Protection in October 2015, ICRP Task Group 79 reported on the "Use of Effective Dose as a Risk-related Radiological Protection Quantity".

This included a proposal to discontinue use of equivalent dose as a separate radiation protection quantity. This would avoid confusion between equivalent dose, effective dose, and dose equivalent, and to use absorbed dose in gray (Gy) as a more appropriate quantity for limiting deterministic effects to the eye lens, skin, hands, and feet. This proposal will need to go through the following stages:

- Discussion within ICRP Committees
- Revision of report by Task Group
- Reconsideration by Committees and Main Commission
- Public Consultation

== Units ==
The SI unit of measure for equivalent dose is the sievert, defined as one joule per kg. In the United States the roentgen equivalent man (rem), equal to 0.01 sievert, is still in common use, although regulatory and advisory bodies are encouraging transition to sievert.

== Related quantities ==
Relation between some ionizing radiation units

=== Limitation of equivalent dose calculation ===
Equivalent dose is used for assessing stochastic health risk due to external radiation fields that penetrate uniformly through the whole body. However, it requires a correction when the field is applied to only part of the body (or non-uniformly) to measure overall stochastic health risk. To enable this, a quantity called effective dose must be used to take into account the varying sensitivity of different organs and tissues to ionizing radiation.

=== Relationship to committed dose ===
Whilst equivalent dose is used to determine the stochastic effects of external radiation, a similar approach is used for internal, or committed dose. The ICRP defines an equivalent dose quantity for individual committed dose, which is used to measure the effect of inhaled or ingested radioactive materials. This quantity is called committed equivalent dose $H_\text{T}(t)$, and is "the time integral of the equivalent dose rate in a particular tissue or organ that will be received by an individual following intake of radioactive material into the body by a Reference Person, where $t$ is the integration time in years." Similar to external equivalent dose, this refers specifically to the absorbed dose in a specific tissue or organ. A committed dose from an internal source represents the same effective risk as the same amount of equivalent dose applied uniformly to the whole body from an external source.

The ICRP states "Radionuclides incorporated in the human body irradiate the tissues over time periods determined by their physical half-life and their biological retention within the body. Thus they may give rise to doses to body tissues for many months or years after the intake. The need to regulate exposures to radionuclides and the accumulation of radiation dose over extended periods of time has led to the definition of committed dose quantities."

=== Equivalent dose versus dose equivalent ===
Though calculated differently, the terms equivalent dose and dose equivalent refer to the same quantity in units of sievert. Although the CIPM definition states that the linear energy transfer function of the ICRU is used in calculating the biological effect of ionizing radiation, the ICRP in 1991 developed the "protection" quantities effective and equivalent dose, which are calculated from more complex models and are distinguished by not having the phrase dose equivalent in their definition.

Prior to 1991, the ICRP used the term "dose equivalent" to refer to absorbed dose multiplied by a quality factor that itself was a function of linear energy transfer (LET). Currently, the ICRP's definition of "equivalent dose" uses radiation weighting factors instead of quality factors to represent the average absorbed dose received by an organ or tissue.

The phrase dose equivalent is still commonly used to mean absorbed dose weighted by a quality factor $Q(\text{LET})$. The following are defined as such by the ICRU and ICRP:

- ambient dose equivalent;
- directional dose equivalent;
- personal dose equivalent.

Furthermore, in the U. S. there are other derivative absorbed dose quantities which are not part of the ICRP system.

=== Use of old factors ===
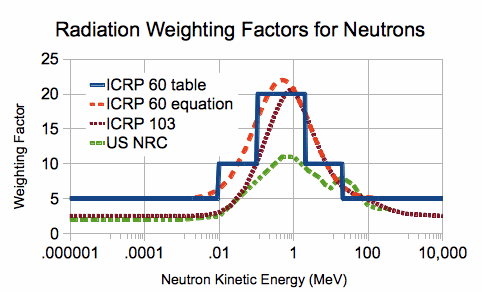
The radiation weighting factor for neutrons has been revised over time, and is different for the U. S. NRC and the ICRP

The International Committee for Weights and Measures (CIPM) and the U.S. Nuclear Regulatory Commission (NRC) continue to use the old terminology of quality factors and dose equivalent. The NRC quality factors are independent of linear energy transfer, though not always equal to the ICRP radiation weighting factors. The NRC's definition of dose equivalent is "the product of the absorbed dose in tissue, quality factor, and all other necessary modifying factors at the location of interest." However, it is apparent from their definition of effective dose equivalent that "all other necessary modifying factors" excludes the tissue weighting factor. As shown in accompanying figure, the radiation weighting factors for neutrons are also different between the U. S. NRC and the ICRP.

=== Dosimetry reports ===
Cumulative equivalent dose due to external whole-body exposure is normally reported to nuclear energy workers in regular dosimetry reports.

In the U. S., three different equivalent doses are typically reported:

- deep-dose equivalent (DDE);
- shallow dose equivalent (SDE);
- eye dose equivalent.

== See also ==
- Banana equivalent dose
- Becquerel
- Counts per minute
- Curie
- Gray (unit)
- Ionizing radiation units
- Ionisation chamber
- Rad (unit)
- Roentgen (unit)
- Roentgen equivalent man
- Sievert
