= Total effective dose equivalent =

The Total effective dose equivalent (TEDE) is a radiation dosimetry quantity defined by the US Nuclear Regulatory Commission to monitor and control human exposure to ionizing radiation. It is defined differently in the NRC regulations and NRC glossary. According to the regulations, it is the sum of effective dose equivalent from external exposure and committed effective dose equivalent from internal exposure, thereby taking into account all known exposures. However, the NRC glossary defines it as the sum of the deep-dose equivalent and committed effective dose equivalent, which would appear to exclude the effective dose to the skin and eyes from non-penetrating radiation such as beta. These surface doses are included in the NRC's shallow dose equivalent, along with contributions from penetrating (gamma) radiation.

Regulatory limits are imposed on the TEDE for occupationally exposed individuals and members of the general public.

== See also ==
- Radioactivity
- Radiation poisoning
- Ionizing radiation
- Deep-dose equivalent
- Collective dose
- Cumulative dose
- Committed dose equivalent
- Committed effective dose equivalent
