= Prehydrated electrons =

Free electrons that occur in water under irradiation

Prehydrated electrons are free electrons that occur in water under irradiation. Usually they form complexes with water molecules and become hydrated electrons. They can also react with the bases of the nucleotides dGMP and dTMP in aqueous solution. This suggests they may also react with the bases of the DNA double helix, ultimately breaking molecular bonds and causing DNA damage. This mechanism is hypothesized to be a cause of radiation damage to DNA.
