= Acute radiation syndrome =

Result of nuclear radiation exposure

- Other names: Radiation poisoning, radiation sickness, radiation toxicity
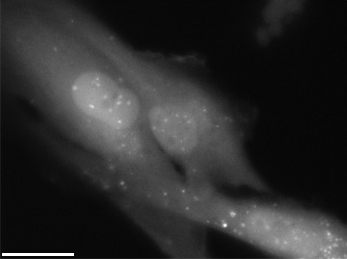
- Radiation causes cellular degradation by autophagy
- Specialty: Radiation oncology, Critical care medicine, Hematology, Emergency medicine
- Symptoms: Early: Nausea, vomiting, skin burns, loss of appetite Later: Infections, bleeding, dehydration, confusion
- Complications: Cancer; Infection
- Usual onset: Within days (dose-dependent)
- Types: Bone marrow syndrome, gastrointestinal syndrome, neurovascular syndrome
- Causes: Large amounts of ionizing radiation over a short period of time
- Diagnostic method: Based on history of exposure and symptoms
- Differential diagnosis: Sepsis; Heat stroke; Gastroenteritis
- Prevention: ALARA principle (time, distance, shielding); Potassium iodide; decontamination of skin regions
- Treatment: Supportive care (blood transfusions, antibiotics, colony stimulating factors, stem cell transplant)
- Medication: Filgrastim, antiemetics, analgesics
- Prognosis: Depends on the exposure dose
- Frequency: Rare

Acute radiation syndrome (ARS), also known as radiation sickness or radiation poisoning, is a collection of health effects that are caused by being exposed to high amounts of ionizing radiation in a short period of time. Symptoms can start within an hour of exposure, and can last for several months. Early symptoms are usually nausea, vomiting and loss of appetite. In the following hours or weeks, initial symptoms may appear to improve, before the development of additional symptoms, after which either recovery or death follows.

ARS involves a total dose of greater than 0.7 Gy (70 rad), which generally occurs from a source outside the body, delivered within a few minutes. Sources of such radiation can occur accidentally or intentionally. They may involve nuclear reactors, cyclotrons, certain devices used in cancer therapy, nuclear weapons, or radiological weapons. It is generally divided into three types: bone marrow, gastrointestinal, and neurovascular syndrome, with bone marrow syndrome occurring at 0.7 to 10 Gy, and neurovascular syndrome occurring at doses that exceed 50 Gy. The cells that are most affected are generally those that are rapidly dividing. At high doses, this causes DNA damage that may be irreparable. Diagnosis is based on a history of exposure and symptoms. Repeated complete blood counts (CBCs) can indicate the severity of exposure.

Treatment of ARS is generally supportive care. This may include blood transfusions, antibiotics, colony-stimulating factors, or stem cell transplant. Radioactive material remaining on the skin or in the stomach should be removed. If radioiodine was inhaled or ingested, potassium iodide is recommended. Complications such as leukemia and other cancers among those who survive are managed as usual. Short-term outcomes depend on the dose exposure.

ARS is generally rare. A single event can affect a large number of people. The vast majority of cases involving ARS, alongside blast effects, were inflicted by the atomic bombings of Hiroshima and Nagasaki, with post-attack deaths in the tens of thousands. Nuclear and radiation accidents and incidents sometimes cause ARS; the worst, the Chernobyl nuclear power plant disaster, caused 134 cases and 28 deaths. ARS differs from chronic radiation syndrome, which occurs following prolonged exposures to relatively low doses of radiation, and from radiation-induced cancer.

== Signs and symptoms ==
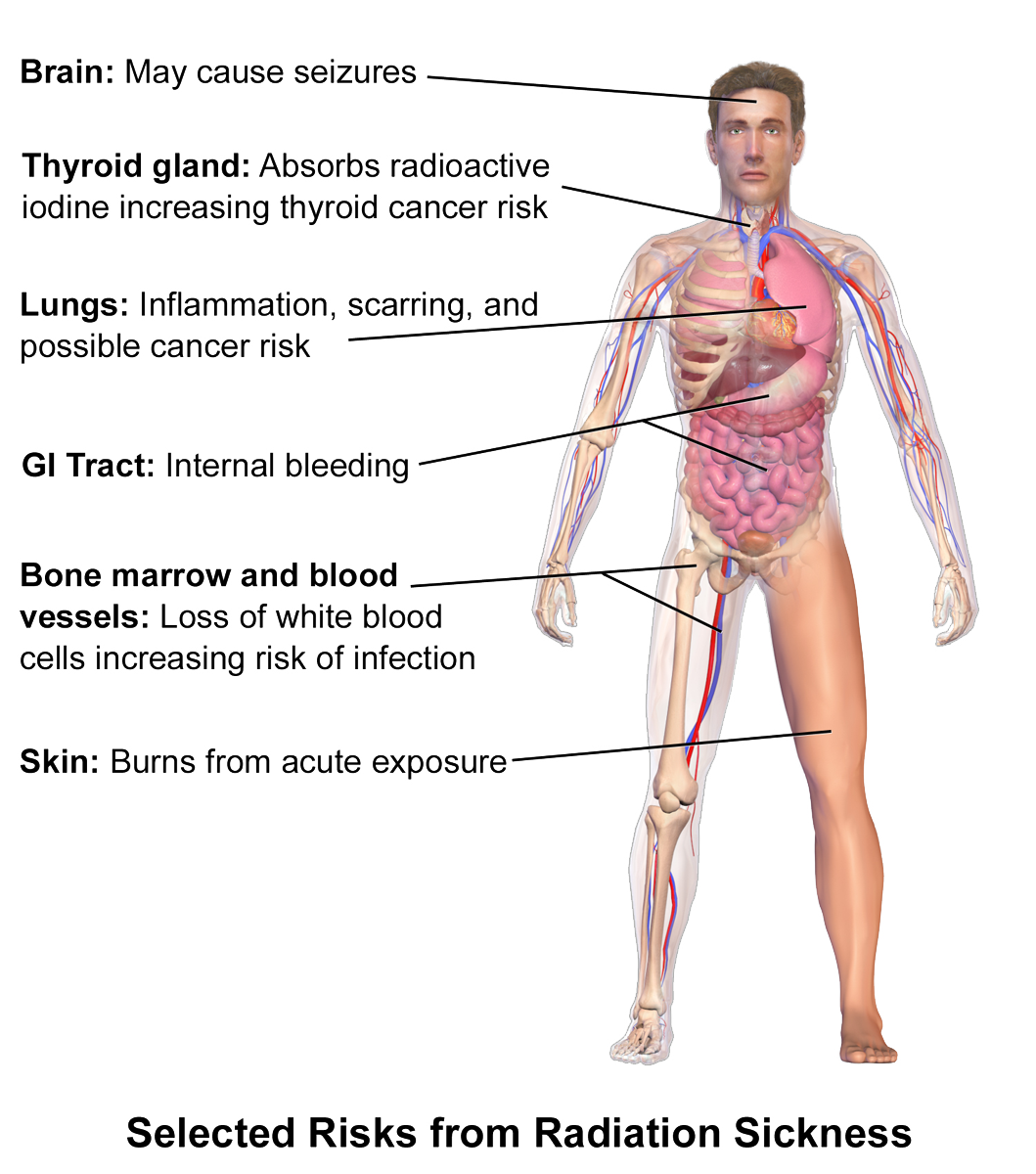
Radiation sickness

Classically, ARS is divided into three main presentations: hematopoietic, gastrointestinal, and neurovascular. These syndromes may be preceded by a prodrome. The speed of symptom onset is related to radiation exposure, with greater doses resulting in a shorter delay in symptom onset. These presentations presume whole-body exposure, and many of them are markers that are invalid if the entire body has not been exposed. Each syndrome requires that the tissue showing the syndrome itself be exposed (for instance, gastrointestinal syndrome is not seen if the stomach and intestines are not exposed to radiation). Some areas affected are:

1. Hematopoietic. This syndrome is marked by a drop in the number of blood cells, called aplastic anemia. This may result in infections, due to a low number of white blood cells, bleeding, due to a lack of platelets, and anemia, due to too few red blood cells in circulation. These changes can be detected by blood tests after receiving a whole-body acute dose as low as 0.25 grays (25 rad), though they might never be felt by the patient if the dose is below 1 gray (100 rad). Conventional trauma and burns resulting from a bomb blast are complicated by the poor wound healing caused by hematopoietic syndrome, increasing mortality.
2. Gastrointestinal. This syndrome often follows absorbed doses of 6–30 grays (600–3,000 rad). The signs and symptoms of this form of radiation injury include nausea, vomiting, loss of appetite, and abdominal pain. Vomiting in this time-frame (1-2h post-exposure) is a marker for whole-body exposures that are in the fatal range above 4 grays (400 rad). Without exotic treatment such as bone marrow transplant, death with this dose is common, due generally more to infection than gastrointestinal dysfunction.
3. Neurovascular. This syndrome typically occurs at absorbed doses greater than 30 grays (3,000 rad), though it may occur at doses as low as 10 grays (1,000 rad). It presents with neurological symptoms such as dizziness, headache, or decreased level of consciousness, occurring within minutes to a few hours, with an absence of vomiting, and is almost always fatal, even with aggressive intensive care.

Early symptoms of ARS typically include nausea, vomiting, headaches, fatigue, fever, and a short period of skin reddening. These symptoms may occur at radiation doses as low as 0.35 grays (35 rad). These symptoms are common to many illnesses, and may not, by themselves, indicate acute radiation sickness.

=== Dose effects ===
Phase	Symptom	Whole-body absorbed dose (Gy)				
Phase	Symptom	1–2 Gy	2–6 Gy	6–8 Gy	8–30 Gy	> 30 Gy
Immediate	Nausea and vomiting	5–50%	50–100%	75–100%	90–100%	100%
Immediate	Time of onset	2–6 h	1–2 h	10–60 min	< 10 min	Minutes
Immediate	Duration	< 24 h	24–48 h	< 48 h	< 48 h	—N/a (patients die in < 48 h)
Immediate	Diarrhea	None	None to mild (< 10%)	Heavy (> 10%)	Heavy (> 95%)	Heavy (100%)
Immediate	Time of onset	—	3–8 h	1–3 h	< 1 h	< 1 h
Immediate	Headache	Slight	Mild to moderate (50%)	Moderate (80%)	Severe (80–90%)	Severe (100%)
Immediate	Time of onset	—	4–24 h	3–4 h	1–2 h	< 1 h
Immediate	Fever	None	Moderate increase (10–100%)	Moderate to severe (100%)	Severe (100%)	Severe (100%)
Immediate	Time of onset	—	1–3 h	< 1 h	< 1 h	< 1 h
Immediate	CNS function	No impairment	Cognitive impairment 6–20 h	Cognitive impairment > 24 h	Rapid incapacitation	Seizures, tremor, ataxia, lethargy
Latent period		28–31 days	7–28 days	< 7 days	None	None
Illness		Mild to moderate leukopenia Fatigue; Weakness	Moderate to severe leukopenia Purpura; Hemorrhage; Infections; Alopecia after 3 Gy	Severe leukopenia High fever Diarrhea; Vomiting; Dizziness and disorientation Hypotension; Electrolyte disturbance	Nausea; Vomiting; Severe diarrhea High fever Electrolyte disturbance Shock	—N/a (patients die in < 48h)
Mortality	Without care	0–5%	5–95%	95–100%	100%	100%
Mortality	With care	0–5%	5–50%	50–100%	99–100%	100%
Mortality	Death	6–8 weeks	4–6 weeks	2–4 weeks	2 days – 2 weeks	1–2 days
Table source

A similar table and description of symptoms (given in rems, where 100 rem = 1 Sv), derived from data from the effects on humans subjected to the atomic bombings of Hiroshima and Nagasaki, the indigenous peoples of the Marshall Islands subjected to the Castle Bravo thermonuclear bomb, animal studies and lab experiment accidents, have been compiled by the U.S. Department of Defense.

A person who was less than 1 mile (1.6 km) from the atomic bomb Little Boy's hypocenter at Hiroshima, Japan, was found to have absorbed about 9.46 grays (Gy) of ionizing radiation. The doses at the hypocenters of the Hiroshima and Nagasaki atomic bombings were 240 and 290 Gy, respectively.

=== Skin changes ===
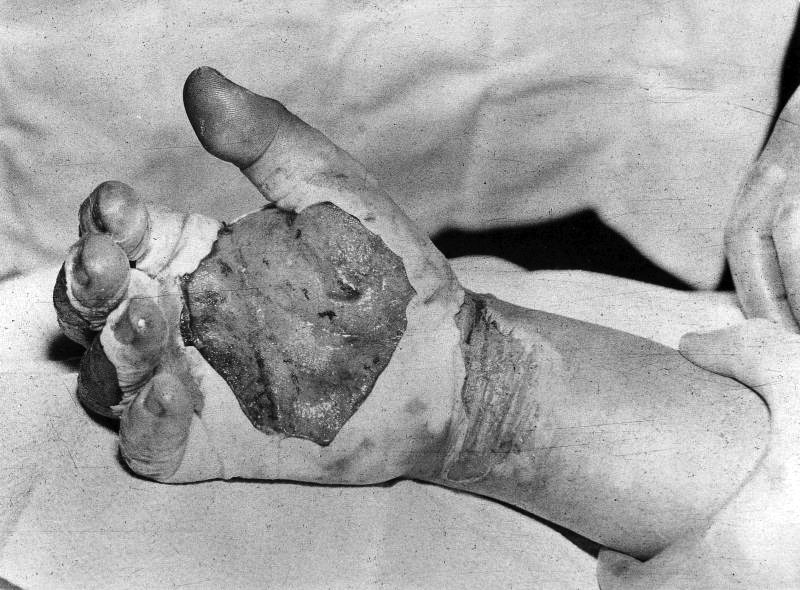
Harry K. Daghlian's hand 9 days after he had manually stopped a prompt critical fission reaction during an accident with what later obtained the nickname the demon core. He received a dose of 5.1 Sv, or 3.1 Gy. He died 16 days after this photo was taken.

Cutaneous radiation syndrome (CRS) refers to the skin symptoms of radiation exposure. Within a few hours after irradiation, a transient and inconsistent redness (associated with itching) can occur. Then, a latent phase may occur and last from a few days up to several weeks, when intense reddening, blistering, and ulceration of the irradiated site is visible. In most cases, healing occurs by regenerative means; however, very large skin doses can cause permanent hair loss, damaged sebaceous and sweat glands, atrophy, fibrosis (mostly keloids), decreased or increased skin pigmentation, and ulceration or necrosis of the exposed tissue.

As seen at Chernobyl, when skin is irradiated with high energy beta particles, moist desquamation (peeling of skin) and similar early effects can heal, only to be followed by the collapse of the dermal vascular system after two months, resulting in the loss of the full thickness of the exposed skin. Another example of skin loss caused by high-level exposure of radiation is during the 1999 Tokaimura nuclear accident, where technician Hisashi Ouchi had lost a majority of his skin due to the high amounts of radiation he absorbed during the irradiation. This effect had been demonstrated previously with pig skin using high energy beta sources at the Churchill Hospital Research Institute, in Oxford.

== Cause ==
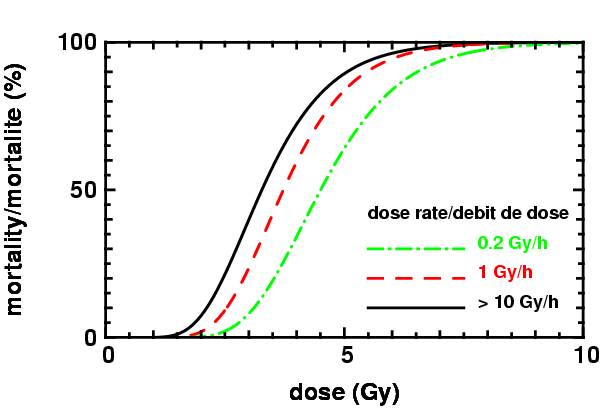
Both dose and dose rate contribute to the severity of acute radiation syndrome. The effects of dose fractionation or rest periods before repeated exposure also shift the LD50 dose upwards.

Comparison of Radiation Doses – includes the amount detected on the trip from Earth to Mars by the RAD on the MSL (2011–2013).

ARS is caused by exposure to a large dose of ionizing radiation (> ≈ 0.1 Gy) over a short period of time (> ≈ 0.1 Gy/h). Alpha and beta radiation have low penetrating power and are unlikely to affect vital internal organs from outside the body. Any type of ionizing radiation can cause burns, but alpha and beta radiation can only do so if radioactive contamination or nuclear fallout is deposited on the individual's skin or clothing.

Gamma and neutron radiation can travel much greater distances and penetrate the body easily, so whole-body irradiation generally causes ARS before skin effects are evident. Local gamma irradiation can cause skin effects without any sickness. In the early twentieth century, radiographers would commonly calibrate their machines by irradiating their own hands and measuring the time to onset of erythema.

=== Accidental ===
Accidental exposure may be the result of a criticality or radiotherapy accident. There have been numerous criticality accidents dating back to atomic testing during World War II, while computer-controlled radiation therapy machines such as Therac-25 played a major part in radiotherapy accidents. The latter of the two is caused by the failure of equipment software used to monitor the radiational dose given. Human error has played a large part in accidental exposure incidents, including some of the criticality accidents, and larger scale events such as the Chernobyl disaster. Other events have to do with orphan sources, in which radioactive material is unknowingly kept, sold, or stolen. The Goiânia accident is an example, where a forgotten radioactive source was taken from a hospital, resulting in the deaths of 4 people from ARS. Theft and attempted theft of radioactive material by clueless thieves has also led to lethal exposure in at least one incident.

Exposure may also come from routine spaceflight and solar flares, which result in radiation effects on earth in the form of solar storms. During spaceflight, astronauts are exposed to both galactic cosmic radiation (GCR) and solar particle event (SPE) radiation. The exposure particularly occurs during flights beyond low Earth orbit (LEO). Evidence indicates past SPE radiation levels that would have been lethal for unprotected astronauts. GCR levels that might lead to acute radiation poisoning are less well understood. The latter cause is rarer, with an event possibly occurring during the solar storm of 1859.

=== Intentional ===
Intentional exposure is controversial as it involves the use of nuclear weapons, human experiments, or is given to a victim in an act of murder. The intentional atomic bombings of Hiroshima and Nagasaki resulted in tens of thousands of casualties; the survivors of these bombings are known today as hibakusha. Nuclear weapons emit large amounts of thermal radiation as visible, infrared, and ultraviolet light, to which the atmosphere is largely transparent. This event is also known as "flash", where radiant heat and light are bombarded into any given victim's exposed skin, causing radiation burns. Death is highly likely, and radiation poisoning is almost certain if one is caught in the open with no terrain or building masking-effects within a radius of 0–3 km from a 1 megaton airburst. The 50% chance of death from the blast extends out to ≈ 8 km from a 1 megaton atmospheric explosion.

Scientific testing on humans within the United States occurred extensively throughout the atomic age. Experiments took place on a range of subjects including, but not limited to; the disabled, children, soldiers, and incarcerated persons, with the level of understanding and consent given by subjects varying from complete to none. Since 1997 there have been requirements for patients to give informed consent, and to be notified if experiments were classified. The Soviet nuclear program also included medical study of exposed citizens living near Semipalatinsk Test Site, withholding information about nuclear testing or health risks. The program also involved severe radiation exposures to workers of the Mayak facility, especially the early work of forced laborers on the A-1 nuclear reactor. Criminal activity has involved murder and attempted murder carried out through abrupt victim contact with a radioactive substance such as polonium or plutonium. The death of Alexander Litvinenko is widely believed to be assassination via polonium poisoning and on the order of the Russian FSB, and polonium is also suspected as the cause of death for Yasser Arafat, Yuri Shchekochikhin, Lecha Islamov and Roman Tsepov.

== Pathophysiology ==
The most commonly used predictor of ARS is the whole-body absorbed dose. Several related quantities, such as the equivalent dose, effective dose, and committed dose, are used to gauge long-term stochastic biological effects such as cancer incidence, but they are not designed to evaluate ARS. To help avoid confusion between these quantities, absorbed dose is measured in units of grays (in SI, unit symbol Gy) or rad (in CGS), while the others are measured in sieverts (in SI, unit symbol Sv) or rem (in CGS). 1 rad = 0.01 Gy and 1 rem = 0.01 Sv.

In most of the acute exposure scenarios that lead to radiation sickness, the bulk of the radiation is external whole-body gamma, in which case the absorbed, equivalent, and effective doses are all equal. There are exceptions, such as the Therac-25 accidents and the 1958 Cecil Kelley criticality accident, where the absorbed doses in Gy or rad are the only useful quantities, because of the targeted nature of the exposure to the body.

Radiotherapy treatments are typically prescribed in terms of the local absorbed dose, which might be 60 Gy or higher. The dose is fractionated to about 2 Gy per day for curative treatment, which allows normal tissues to undergo repair, allowing them to tolerate a higher dose than would otherwise be expected. The dose to the targeted tissue mass must be averaged over the entire body mass, most of which receives negligible radiation, to arrive at a whole-body absorbed dose that can be compared to the table above.

=== DNA damage ===
Exposure to high doses of radiation causes DNA damage, later creating serious and even lethal chromosomal aberrations if left unrepaired. Ionizing radiation can produce reactive oxygen species, and does directly damage cells by causing localized ionization events. The former is very damaging to DNA, while the latter events create clusters of DNA damage. This damage includes loss of nucleobases and breakage of the sugar-phosphate backbone that binds to the nucleobases. The DNA organization at the level of histones, nucleosomes, and chromatin also affects its susceptibility to radiation damage. Clustered damage, defined as at least two lesions within a helical turn, is especially harmful. While DNA damage happens frequently and naturally in the cell from endogenous sources, clustered damage is a unique effect of radiation exposure. Clustered damage takes longer to repair than isolated breakages, and is less likely to be repaired at all. Larger radiation doses are more prone to cause tighter clustering of damage, and closely localized damage is increasingly less likely to be repaired.

Somatic mutations cannot be passed down from parent to offspring, but these mutations can propagate in cell lines within an organism. Radiation damage can also cause chromosome and chromatid aberrations, and their effects depend on in which stage of the mitotic cycle the cell is when the irradiation occurs. If the cell is in interphase, while it is still a single strand of chromatin, the damage will be replicated during the S1 phase of the cell cycle, and there will be a break on both chromosome arms; the damage then will be apparent in both daughter cells. If the irradiation occurs after replication, only one arm will bear the damage; this damage will be apparent in only one daughter cell. A damaged chromosome may cyclize, binding to another chromosome, or to itself.

== Diagnosis ==
Diagnosis is typically made based on a history of significant radiation exposure and suitable clinical findings. An absolute lymphocyte count can give a rough estimate of radiation exposure. Time from exposure to vomiting can also give estimates of exposure levels if they are less than 10 Gy (1000 rad).

== Prevention ==
A guiding principle of radiation safety is as low as reasonably achievable (ALARA). This means try to avoid exposure as much as possible and includes the three components of time, distance, and shielding.

=== Time ===
The longer that humans are subjected to radiation the larger the dose will be. The advice in the nuclear war manual entitled Nuclear War Survival Skills published by Cresson Kearny in the U.S. was that if one needed to leave the shelter then this should be done as rapidly as possible to minimize exposure.

In chapter 12, he states that "[q]uickly putting or dumping wastes outside is not hazardous once fallout is no longer being deposited. For example, assume the shelter is in an area of heavy fallout and the dose rate outside is 400 roentgen (R) per hour, enough to give a potentially fatal dose in about an hour to a person exposed in the open. If a person needs to be exposed for only 10 seconds to dump a bucket, in this 1/360 of an hour he will receive a dose of only about 1 R. Under war conditions, an additional 1-R dose is of little concern." In peacetime, radiation workers are taught to work as quickly as possible when performing a task that exposes them to radiation, such as for instance during recovery of a radioactive source.

=== Shielding ===
Usually, matter attenuates radiation, so placing any mass (for instance, lead, dirt, sandbags, vehicles, water, even air) between humans and the source will reduce the radiation dose. This is not always the case, however; care should be taken when constructing shielding for a specific purpose. For example, although high atomic number materials are very effective in shielding photons, using them to shield beta particles may cause higher radiation exposure due to the production of bremsstrahlung x-rays, and hence low atomic number materials are recommended. Also, using material with a high neutron activation cross section to shield neutrons will result in the shielding material itself becoming radioactive and hence more dangerous than if it were not present.

There are many types of shielding strategies that can be used to reduce the effects of radiation exposure. Internal contamination protective equipment such as respirators are used to prevent internal deposition as a result of inhalation and ingestion of radioactive material. Dermal protective equipment, which protects against external contamination, provides shielding to prevent radioactive material from being deposited on external structures. While these protective measures do provide a barrier from radioactive material deposition, they do not shield from externally penetrating gamma radiation. This leaves anyone exposed to penetrating gamma rays at high risk of ARS.

Naturally, shielding the entire body from high energy gamma radiation is optimal, but the required mass to provide adequate attenuation makes functional movement nearly impossible. In the event of a radiation catastrophe, medical and security personnel need mobile protection equipment in order to safely assist in containment, evacuation, and many other necessary public safety objectives.

Research has been done exploring the feasibility of partial body shielding, a radiation protection strategy that provides adequate attenuation to only the most radio-sensitive organs and tissues inside the body. Irreversible stem cell damage in the bone marrow is the first life-threatening effect of intense radiation exposure and therefore one of the most important bodily elements to protect. Due to the regenerative property of hematopoietic stem cells, it is only necessary to protect enough bone marrow to repopulate the exposed areas of the body with the shielded supply. This concept allows for the development of lightweight mobile radiation protection equipment, which provides adequate protection, deferring the onset of ARS to much higher exposure doses. One example of such equipment is the 360 Gamma, a radiation protection belt that applies selective shielding to protect the bone marrow stored in the pelvic area as well as other radio sensitive organs in the abdominal region without hindering functional mobility.

=== Reduction of incorporation ===
Where radioactive contamination is present, an elastomeric respirator, dust mask, or good hygiene practices may offer protection, depending on the nature of the contaminant. Potassium iodide (KI) tablets can reduce the risk of cancer in some situations due to slower uptake of ambient radioiodine. Although this does not protect any organ other than the thyroid gland, their effectiveness is still highly dependent on the time of ingestion, which would protect the gland for the duration of a twenty-four-hour period. They do not prevent ARS as they provide no shielding from other environmental radionuclides.

=== Fractionation of dose ===
If an intentional dose is broken up into a number of smaller doses, with time allowed for recovery between irradiations, the same total dose causes less cell death. Even without interruptions, a reduction in dose rate below 0.1 Gy/h also tends to reduce cell death. This technique is routinely used in radiotherapy.

The human body contains many types of cells and a human can be killed by the loss of a single type of cells in a vital organ. For many short term radiation deaths (3–30 days), the loss of two important types of cells that are constantly being regenerated causes death. The loss of cells forming blood cells (bone marrow) and the cells in the digestive system (microvilli, which form part of the wall of the intestines) is fatal.

== Management ==
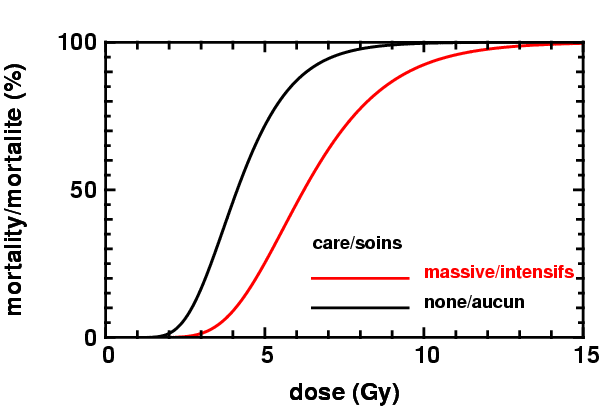
Effect of medical care on acute radiation syndrome

Treatment usually involves supportive care with possible symptomatic measures employed. The former involves the possible use of antibiotics, blood products, colony stimulating factors, and stem cell transplant.

=== Antimicrobials ===
There is a direct relationship between the degree of the neutropenia that emerges after exposure to radiation and the increased risk of developing infection. Since there are no controlled studies of therapeutic intervention in humans, most of the current recommendations are based on animal research.

The treatment of established or suspected infection following exposure to radiation (characterized by neutropenia and fever) is similar to the one used for other febrile neutropenic patients. However, important differences between the two conditions exist. Individuals that develop neutropenia after exposure to radiation are also susceptible to irradiation damage in other tissues, such as the gastrointestinal tract, lungs and central nervous system. These patients may require therapeutic interventions not needed in other types of neutropenic patients. The response of irradiated animals to antimicrobial therapy can be unpredictable, as was evident in experimental studies where metronidazole and pefloxacin therapies were detrimental.

Antimicrobials that reduce the number of the strict anaerobic component of the gut flora (for instance, metronidazole) generally should not be given because they may enhance systemic infection by aerobic or facultative bacteria, thus facilitating mortality after irradiation.

An empirical regimen of antimicrobials should be chosen based on the pattern of bacterial susceptibility and nosocomial infections in the affected area and medical center and the degree of neutropenia. Broad-spectrum empirical therapy (see below for choices) with high doses of one or more antibiotics should be initiated at the onset of fever. These antimicrobials should be directed at the eradication of Gram-negative aerobic bacilli (that is, Enterobacteriaceae, Pseudomonas), which account for more than three quarters of the isolates causing sepsis. Because aerobic and facultative Gram-positive bacteria (mostly alpha-hemolytic streptococci) cause sepsis in about a quarter of the victims, coverage for these organisms may also be needed.

A standardized management plan for people with neutropenia and fever should be devised. Empirical regimens contain antibiotics broadly active against Gram-negative aerobic bacteria (quinolones: for instance, ciprofloxacin, levofloxacin, a third- or fourth-generation cephalosporin with pseudomonal coverage: for instance, cefepime, ceftazidime, or an aminoglycoside: for instance, gentamicin, amikacin).

== Prognosis ==
The prognosis for ARS is dependent on the exposure dose, with anything above 8 Gy being almost always lethal, even with medical care. Radiation burns from lower-level exposures usually manifest after 2 months, while reactions from the burns occur months to years after radiation treatment. Complications from ARS include an increased risk of developing radiation-induced cancer later in life. According to the controversial but commonly applied linear no-threshold model, any exposure to ionizing radiation, even at doses too low to produce any symptoms of radiation sickness, can induce cancer due to cellular and genetic damage. The probability of developing cancer is a linear function with respect to the effective radiation dose. Radiation cancer may occur after ionizing radiation exposure following a latent period averaging 20 to 40 years.

== History ==
Acute effects of ionizing radiation were first observed when Wilhelm Röntgen intentionally subjected his fingers to X-rays in 1895. He published his observations concerning the burns that developed that eventually healed, and misattributed them to ozone. Röntgen believed the free radical produced in air by X-rays from the ozone was the cause, but other free radicals produced within the body are now understood to be more important. David Walsh first established the symptoms of radiation sickness in 1897.

Ingestion of radioactive materials caused many radiation-induced cancers in the 1930s, but no one was exposed to high enough doses at high enough rates to bring on ARS.

The atomic bombings of Hiroshima and Nagasaki resulted in high acute doses of radiation to a large number of Japanese people, allowing for greater insight into its symptoms and dangers. Red Cross Hospital Surgeon Terufumi Sasaki led intensive research into the syndrome in the weeks and months following the Hiroshima and Nagasaki bombings. Sasaki and his team were able to monitor the effects of radiation in patients of varying proximities to the blast itself, leading to the establishment of three recorded stages of the syndrome. Within 25–30 days of the explosion, Sasaki noticed a sharp drop in white blood cell count and established this drop, along with symptoms of fever, as prognostic standards for ARS. Actress Midori Naka, who was present during the atomic bombing of Hiroshima, was the first incident of radiation poisoning to be extensively studied. Her death on 24 August 1945 was the first death ever to be officially certified as a result of ARS (or "Atomic bomb disease").

There are two major databases that track radiation accidents: The American ORISE REAC/TS and the European IRSN ACCIRAD. REAC/TS shows 417 accidents occurring between 1944 and 2000, causing about 3000 cases of ARS, of which 127 were fatal. ACCIRAD lists 580 accidents with 180 ARS fatalities for an almost identical period. The two deliberate bombings are not included in either database, nor are any possible radiation-induced cancers from low doses. The detailed accounting is difficult because of confounding factors. ARS may be accompanied by conventional injuries such as steam burns, or may occur in someone with a pre-existing condition undergoing radiotherapy. There may be multiple causes for death, and the contribution from radiation may be unclear. Some documents may incorrectly refer to radiation-induced cancers as radiation poisoning, or may count all overexposed individuals as survivors without mentioning if they had any symptoms of ARS.

=== Notable cases ===
The following table includes only individuals known to have symptoms of ARS. Excluded are cases of chronic radiation syndrome, such as the case of Albert Stevens. Chronic radiation syndrome is characterized by an exposure of lower doses of radiation, over a longer duration, than with ARS. The table also excludes cases where an individual was exposed to so much radiation that death occurred before medical assistance or dose estimations could be made, such as an attempted cobalt-60 thief who reportedly died 30 minutes after exposure. The result column represents the time from exposure to the time of death. As ARS is measured by a whole-body absorbed dose, the exposure column only includes units of gray (Gy).

Date	Name	Exposure Gy	Incident/accident	Result
August 21, 1945	Harry Daghlian	3.1 Gy	Harry Daghlian criticality accident	Death in 25 days
May 21, 1946	Louis Slotin	11 Gy	Slotin criticality accident	Death in 9 days
May 21, 1946	Alvin C. Graves	1.9 Gy	Slotin criticality accident	Survived
December 30, 1958	Cecil Kelley	36 Gy	Cecil Kelley criticality accident	Death in 38 hours
July 24, 1964	Robert Peabody	~100 Gy	Robert Peabody criticality accident	Death in 49 hours
May 26, 1971	I. I. Vasil’ev	~60 Gy	SF-3 Criticality Accident	Death in 5 days
April 26, 1986	Aleksandr Akimov	15 Gy	Chernobyl disaster	Death in 14 days
April 26, 1986	Andrei Tormozin	8.7 Gy	Chernobyl disaster	Survived
September 30, 1999	Hisashi Ouchi	17 Gy	Tokaimura nuclear accident	Death in 83 days
September 30, 1999	Masato Shinohara	10 Gy	Tokaimura nuclear accident	Death in 210 days
December 2, 2001	Patient "1-DN"	3.6 Gy	Lia radiological accident	Death in 893 days

== Animals ==
Thousands of scientific experiments have been performed to study ARS in animals. There is a simple guide for predicting survival and death in mammals, including humans, following the acute effects of inhaling radioactive particles.

== See also ==
- 5-Androstenediol
- Biological effects of ionizing radiation
- Biological effects of radiation on the epigenome
- CBLB502
- Ex-Rad
- List of civilian nuclear accidents
- List of military nuclear accidents
- Nuclear terrorism
- Orders of magnitude (radiation)
- Prehydrated electrons
- Rongelap Atoll
