= Radiation-induced cancer =

Cancer caused by ionizing radiation exposure

Exposure to ionizing radiation is known to increase the future incidence of cancer, particularly leukemia. The mechanism by which this occurs is well understood, but quantitative models predicting the level of risk remain controversial. The most widely accepted model posits that the incidence of cancers due to ionizing radiation increases linearly with effective radiation dose at a rate of 5.5% per sievert; if correct, natural background radiation is the most hazardous source of radiation to general public health, followed by medical imaging as a close second. Additionally, the vast majority of non-invasive cancers are non-melanoma skin cancers caused by ultraviolet radiation (which lies on the boundary between ionizing and non-ionizing radiation). Non-ionizing radio frequency radiation from mobile phones, electric power transmission, and other similar sources have been investigated as a possible carcinogen by the WHO's International Agency for Research on Cancer, but to date, no evidence of this has been observed.

== Causes ==
According to the prevalent model, any radiation exposure can increase the risk of cancer. Typical contributors to such risk include natural background radiation, medical procedures, occupational exposures, nuclear accidents, and many others. Some major contributors are discussed below.

=== Radon ===
Radon is responsible for the worldwide majority of the mean public exposure to ionizing radiation. It is often the single largest contributor to an individual's background radiation dose, and is the most variable from location to location. Radon gas from natural sources can accumulate in buildings, especially in confined areas such as attics, and basements. It can also be found in some spring waters and hot springs.

Epidemiological evidence shows a clear link between lung cancer and high concentrations of radon, with 21,000 radon-induced U.S. lung cancer deaths per year—second only to cigarette smoking—according to the United States Environmental Protection Agency. Thus in geographic areas where radon is present in heightened concentrations, radon is considered a significant indoor air contaminant.

Residential exposure to radon gas has similar cancer risks as passive smoking. Radiation is a more potent source of cancer when it is combined with other cancer-causing agents, such as radon gas exposure plus smoking tobacco.

=== Medical ===
In industrialized countries, medical imaging contributes almost as much radiation dose to the public as natural background radiation. Collective dose to Americans from medical imaging grew by a factor of six from 1990 to 2006, mostly due to growing use of 3D scans that impart much more dose per procedure than traditional radiographs. CT scans alone, which account for half the medical imaging dose to the public, are estimated to be responsible for 0.4% of current cancers in the United States, and this may increase to as high as 1.5–2% with 2007 rates of CT usage; however, this estimate is disputed. Other nuclear medicine techniques involve the injection of radioactive pharmaceuticals directly into the bloodstream, and radiotherapy treatments deliberately deliver lethal doses (on a cellular level) to tumors and surrounding tissues.

It has been estimated that CT scans performed in the US in 2007 alone will result in 29,000 new cancer cases in future years. This estimate is criticized by the American College of Radiology (ACR), which maintains that the life expectancy of CT scanned patients is not that of the general population and that the model of calculating cancer is based on total-body radiation exposure and thus faulty.

=== Occupational ===
In accordance with ICRP recommendations, most regulators permit nuclear energy workers to receive up to 20 times more radiation dose than is permitted for the general public. Higher doses are usually permitted when responding to an emergency. The majority of workers are routinely kept well within regulatory limits, while a few essential technicians will routinely approach their maximum each year. Accidental overexposures beyond regulatory limits happen globally several times a year. Astronauts on long missions are at higher risk of cancer, see cancer and spaceflight.

Some occupations are exposed to radiation without being classed as nuclear energy workers. Airline crews receive occupational exposures from cosmic radiation because of reduced atmospheric shielding at altitude. Mine workers receive occupational exposures to radon, especially in uranium mines. Anyone working in a granite building, such as the US Capitol, is likely to receive a dose from natural uranium in the granite.

=== Accidental ===
Chernobyl radiation map from 1996

Nuclear accidents can have dramatic consequences to their surroundings, but their overall global population impact on cancer is less than that of natural and medical exposures depending on dose rates.

The most severe nuclear accident at a commercial nuclear power plant is most notably the 1986 Chernobyl disaster. There is consensus that a total of approximately 30 people died from immediate blast trauma and acute radiation syndrome (ARS) in the seconds to months after the disaster respectively, with 60 in total in the decades since, inclusive of later radiation induced cancer.

However, there is considerable debate concerning the accurate number of projected deaths that have yet to occur due to the disaster's long-term health effects; long-term death estimates range from 4,000 up to 9,000 (per the 2005 and updated 2006 conclusions of a joint consortium of the United Nations) for the most exposed people of Ukraine, Belarus, and Russia, to 16,000 cases in total for all those exposed on the entire continent of Europe, with figures as high as 60,000 when including the relatively minor effects around the globe. Such numbers are based on the heavily contested linear no-threshold model.

Of the 100 million curies (4 exabecquerels) of radioactive material, the short lived radioactive isotopes such as ^{131}I Chernobyl released were initially the most dangerous. Due to their short half-lives of 5 and 8 days they have now decayed, leaving the more long-lived ^{137}Cs (with a half-life of 30.07 years) and ^{90}Sr (with a half-life of 28.78 years) as main dangers.

In March 2011, an earthquake and tsunami caused damage that led to explosions and partial meltdowns at the Fukushima I Nuclear Power Plant in Japan. Significant release of radioactive material took place following hydrogen explosions at three reactors, as technicians tried to pump in seawater to keep the uranium fuel rods cool, and bled radioactive gas from the reactors in order to make room for the seawater. Concerns about the large-scale release of radioactivity resulted in 20 km exclusion zone being set up around the power plant and people within the 20–30 km zone being advised to stay indoors. On March 24, 2011, Japanese officials announced that "radioactive iodine-131 exceeding safety limits for infants had been detected at 18 water-purification plants in Tokyo and five other prefectures".

Also in Japan was the Tokaimura nuclear accidents of 1997 and 1999. The 1997 accident was far less fatal than the 1999 accident. The 1999 nuclear accident was caused by two faulty technicians who, in their desire to speed up the process of converting uranium hexafluoride to enriched uranium dioxide, resulted in a critical mass that resulted in technicians Hisashi Ouchi being dosed with approximately 17 sieverts of radiation and Masato Shinohara to be dosed with 10 sieverts of radiation, which resulted in their deaths. The two's supervisor, Yutaka Yokokawa, who was sitting in a desk far from the tank where the uranium hexafluoride was being poured into, was dosed with 3 sieverts and survived, but was charged with negligence in October 2000.

In 2003, in autopsies performed on six dead children in the polluted area near Chernobyl where they also reported a higher incidence of pancreatic tumors, Bandazhevsky found a concentration of ^{137}Cs of 40–45 times higher than in their liver, thus demonstrating that pancreatic tissue is a strong accumulator of radioactive cesium. In 2020, Zrielykh reported a high and statistically significant incidence of pancreatic cancer in Ukraine for a period of 10 year, there have been cases of morbidity also in children in 2013 compared with 2003.

Other serious radiation accidents include the Kyshtym disaster (estimated 49 to 55 cancer deaths), and the Windscale fire (an estimated 33 cancer deaths).

The satellite Transit 5BN-3 accident. The satellite had a SNAP-3 radioisotope thermoelectric generator (RTG) with approximately 1 kilogram of plutonium-238 on board when on April 21, 1964 it burned up and re-entered the atmosphere. Dr. John Gofman claimed it increased the rate of lung cancer worldwide. He said "Although it is impossible to estimate the number of lung cancers induced by the accident, there is no question that the dispersal of so much plutonium-238 would add to the number of lung cancers diagnosed over many subsequent decades." Other satellite failures include Kosmos 954 and Kosmos 1402.

== Mechanism ==
Cancer is a stochastic effect of radiation, meaning it is an unpredictable event. The probability of occurrence increases with effective radiation dose, but the severity of the cancer is independent of dose. The speed at which cancer advances, the prognosis, the degree of pain, and every other feature of the disease are not functions of the radiation dose to which the person is exposed. This contrasts with the deterministic effects of acute radiation syndrome which increase in severity with dose above a threshold. Cancer starts with a single cell whose operation is disrupted. Normal cell operation is controlled by the chemical structure of DNA molecules, also called chromosomes.

When radiation deposits enough energy in organic tissue to cause ionization, this tends to break molecular bonds, and thus alter the molecular structure of the irradiated molecules. Less energetic radiation, such as visible light, only causes excitation, not ionization, which is usually dissipated as heat with relatively little chemical damage. Ultraviolet light is usually categorized as non-ionizing, but it is actually in an intermediate range that produces some ionization and chemical damage. Hence the carcinogenic mechanism of ultraviolet radiation is similar to that of ionizing radiation.

Unlike chemical or physical triggers for cancer, penetrating radiation hits molecules within cells randomly. (Note: In the case of internal contamination with alpha emitters, the distribution may not be so random. Transuranic elements are believed to have a chemical affinity for DNA, and any radioactive element could be part of a chemical compound that targets certain molecules.) Molecules broken by radiation can become highly reactive free radicals that cause further chemical damage. Some of this direct and indirect damage will eventually impact chromosomes and epigenetic factors that control the expression of genes. Cellular mechanisms will repair some of this damage, but some repairs will be incorrect and some chromosome abnormalities will turn out to be irreversible.

DNA double-strand breaks (DSBs) are generally accepted to be the most biologically significant lesion by which ionizing radiation causes cancer. In vitro experiments show that ionizing radiation cause DSBs at a rate of 35 DSBs per cell per Gray, and removes a portion of the epigenetic markers of the DNA, which regulate the gene expression. Most of the induced DSBs are repaired within 24h after exposure, however, 25% of the repaired strands are repaired incorrectly and about 20% of fibroblast cells that were exposed to 200mGy died within 4 days after exposure. A portion of the population possess a flawed DNA repair mechanism, and thus suffer a greater insult due to exposure to radiation.

Major damage normally results in the cell dying or being unable to reproduce. This effect is responsible for acute radiation syndrome, but these heavily damaged cells cannot become cancerous. Lighter damage may leave a stable, partly functional cell that may be capable of proliferating and eventually developing into cancer, especially if tumor suppressor genes are damaged. The latest research suggests that mutagenic events do not occur immediately after irradiation. Instead, surviving cells appear to have acquired a genomic instability which causes an increased rate of mutations in future generations. The cell will then progress through multiple stages of neoplastic transformation that may culminate into a tumor after years of incubation. The neoplastic transformation can be divided into three major independent stages: morphological changes to the cell, acquisition of cellular immortality (losing normal, life-limiting cell regulatory processes), and adaptations that favor formation of a tumor.

In some cases, a small radiation dose reduces the impact of a subsequent, larger radiation dose. This has been termed an 'adaptive response' and is related to hypothetical mechanisms of hormesis.

A latent period of decades may elapse between radiation exposure and the detection of cancer. Those cancers that may develop as a result of radiation exposure are indistinguishable from those that occur naturally or as a result of exposure to other carcinogens. Furthermore, National Cancer Institute literature indicates that chemical and physical hazards and lifestyle factors, such as smoking, alcohol consumption, and diet, significantly contribute to many of these same diseases. Evidence from uranium miners suggests that smoking may have a multiplicative, rather than additive, interaction with radiation. Evaluations of radiation's contribution to cancer incidence can only be done through large epidemiological studies with thorough data about all other confounding risk factors. An unprecedented mechanism of radiation-induced pancreatic carcinogenesis has been highlighted through the concentration and elimination of radiocesium in pancreatic duct and juice. Studies by Nelson, Sodee, Bandazhevsky, Venturi, and others, have reported that pancreatic cells have a very high capacity to concentrate the carcinogenic radioactive Cesium in experimental scintigraphies with Cs-137 and in environments polluted by radioactive fallout in mammals (mice, dogs and humans) and also in birds and fish (chickens and carp). Ionizing radiation of 137-Cs causes cytoplasmic vacuolization, dilatation of the endoplasmic reticulum and destruction of mitochondria of various sizes and morphology, and dense areas of chromatin at the periphery of the nucleus of pancreatic, thyroidal and salivary cells.

== Skin cancer ==
Prolonged exposure to ultraviolet radiation from the sun can lead to melanoma and other skin malignancies. Clear evidence establishes ultraviolet radiation, especially the non-ionizing medium wave UVB, as the cause of most non-melanoma skin cancers, which are the most common forms of cancer in the world.

Skin cancer may occur following ionizing radiation exposure following a latent period averaging 20 to 40 years. A chronic radiation keratosis is a precancerous keratotic skin lesion that may arise on the skin many years after exposure to ionizing radiation. Various malignancies may develop, most frequency basal-cell carcinoma followed by squamous-cell carcinoma. Elevated risk is confined to the site of radiation exposure. Several studies have also suggested the possibility of a causal relationship between melanoma and ionizing radiation exposure. The degree of carcinogenic risk arising from low levels of exposure is more contentious, but the available evidence points to an increased risk that is approximately proportional to the dose received. Radiologists and radiographers are among the earliest occupational groups exposed to radiation. It was the observation of the earliest radiologists that led to the recognition of radiation-induced skin cancer—the first solid cancer linked to radiation—in 1902. While the incidence of skin cancer secondary to medical ionizing radiation was higher in the past, there is also some evidence that risks of certain cancers, notably skin cancer, may be increased among more recent medical radiation workers, and this may be related to specific or changing radiologic practices. Available evidence indicates that the excess risk of skin cancer lasts for 45 years or more following irradiation.

== Epidemiology ==
Cancer is a stochastic effect of radiation, meaning that it only has a probability of occurrence, as opposed to deterministic effects which always happen over a certain dose threshold. The consensus of the nuclear industry, nuclear regulators, and governments, is that the incidence of cancers due to ionizing radiation can be modeled as increasing linearly with effective radiation dose at a rate of 5.5% per sievert. Individual studies, alternate models, and earlier versions of the industry consensus have produced other risk estimates scattered around this consensus model. There is general agreement that the risk is much higher for infants and fetuses than adults, higher for the middle-aged than for seniors, and higher for women than for men, though there is no quantitative consensus about this. This model is widely accepted for external radiation, but its application to internal contamination is disputed. For example, the model fails to account for the low rates of cancer in early workers at Los Alamos National Laboratory who were exposed to plutonium dust, and the high rates of thyroid cancer in children following the Chernobyl accident, both of which were internal exposure events. Chris Busby of the self styled "European Committee on Radiation Risk", calls the ICRP model "fatally flawed" when it comes to internal exposure.

Radiation can cause cancer in most parts of the body, in all animals, and at any age, although radiation-induced solid tumors usually take 10–15 years, and can take up to 40 years, to become clinically manifest, and radiation-induced leukemias typically require 2–9 years to appear. Some people, such as those with nevoid basal cell carcinoma syndrome or retinoblastoma, are more susceptible than average to developing cancer from radiation exposure. Children and adolescents are twice as likely to develop radiation-induced leukemia as adults; radiation exposure before birth has ten times the effect.

Radiation exposure can cause cancer in any living tissue, but high-dose whole-body external exposure is most closely associated with leukemia, reflecting the high radiosensitivity of bone marrow. Internal exposures tend to cause cancer in the organs where the radioactive material concentrates, so that radon predominantly causes lung cancer, iodine-131 for thyroid cancer is most likely to cause leukemia.

=== Data sources ===
Increased Risk of Solid Cancer with Dose for atomic blast survivors

The associations between ionizing radiation exposure and the development of cancer are based primarily on the "LSS cohort" of Japanese atomic bomb survivors, the largest human population ever exposed to high levels of ionizing radiation. However this cohort was also exposed to high heat, both from the initial nuclear flash of infrared light and following the blast due their exposure to the firestorm and general fires that developed in both cities respectively, so the survivors also underwent Hyperthermia therapy to various degrees. Hyperthermia, or heat exposure following irradiation is well known in the field of radiation therapy to markedly increase the severity of free-radical insults to cells following irradiation. Presently however no attempts have been made to cater for this confounding factor, it is not included or corrected for in the dose-response curves for this group.

Additional data has been collected from recipients of selected medical procedures and the 1986 Chernobyl disaster. There is a clear link between the Chernobyl accident and the unusually large number, approximately 1,800, of thyroid cancers reported in contaminated areas, mostly in children.

For low levels of radiation, the biological effects are so small they may not be detected in epidemiological studies. Although radiation may cause cancer at high doses and high dose rates, public health data regarding lower levels of exposure, below about 10 mSv (1,000 mrem), are harder to interpret. To assess the health impacts of lower radiation doses, researchers rely on models of the process by which radiation causes cancer; several models that predict differing levels of risk have emerged.

Studies of occupational workers exposed to chronic low levels of radiation, above normal background, have provided mixed evidence regarding cancer and transgenerational effects. Cancer results, although uncertain, are consistent with estimates of risk based on atomic bomb survivors and suggest that these workers do face a small increase in the probability of developing leukemia and other cancers. One of the most recent and extensive studies of workers was published by Cardis et al. in 2005. There is evidence that low level, brief radiation exposures are not harmful.

=== Modelling ===
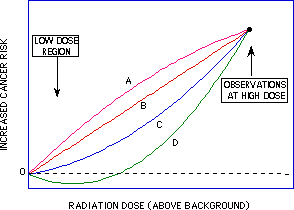
Alternative assumptions for the extrapolation of the cancer risk vs. radiation dose to low-dose levels, given a known risk at a high dose: supra-linearity (A), linear (B), linear-quadratic (C) and hormesis (D).

The linear dose-response model suggests that any increase in dose, no matter how small, results in an incremental increase in risk. The linear no-threshold model (LNT) hypothesis is accepted by the International Commission on Radiological Protection (ICRP) and regulators around the world. According to this model, about 1% of the global population develop cancer as a result of natural background radiation at some point in their lifetime. For comparison, 13% of deaths in 2008 are attributed to cancer, so background radiation could plausibly be a small contributor.

Many parties have criticized the ICRP's adoption of the linear no-threshold model for exaggerating the effects of low radiation doses. The most frequently cited alternatives are the "linear quadratic" model and the "hormesis" model. The linear quadratic model is widely viewed in radiotherapy as the best model of cellular survival, and it is the best fit to leukemia data from the LSS cohort.

Linear no-threshold	F(D)=α⋅D
Linear quadratic	F(D)=α⋅D+β⋅D^{2}
Hormesis	F(D)=α⋅[D−β]

In all three cases, the values of alpha and beta must be determined by regression from human exposure data. Laboratory experiments on animals and tissue samples is of limited value. Most of the high quality human data available is from high dose individuals, above 0.1 Sv, so any use of the models at low doses is an extrapolation that might be under-conservative or over-conservative. There is not enough human data available to settle decisively which of these model might be most accurate at low doses. The consensus has been to assume linear no-threshold because it the simplest and most conservative of the three.

Radiation hormesis is the conjecture that a low level of ionizing radiation (i.e., near the level of Earth's natural background radiation) helps "immunize" cells against DNA damage from other causes (such as free radicals or larger doses of ionizing radiation), and decreases the risk of cancer. The theory proposes that such low levels activate the body's DNA repair mechanisms, causing higher levels of cellular DNA-repair proteins to be present in the body, improving the body's ability to repair DNA damage. This assertion is very difficult to prove in humans (using, for example, statistical cancer studies) because the effects of very low ionizing radiation levels are too small to be statistically measured amid the "noise" of normal cancer rates.

The idea of radiation hormesis is considered unproven by regulatory bodies. If the hormesis model turns out to be accurate, it is conceivable that current regulations based on the LNT model will prevent or limit the hormetic effect, and thus have a negative impact on health.

Other non-linear effects have been observed, particularly for internal doses. For example, iodine-131 is notable in that high doses of the isotope are sometimes less dangerous than low doses, since they tend to kill thyroid tissues that would otherwise become cancerous as a result of the radiation. Most studies of very-high-dose I-131 for treatment of Graves disease have failed to find any increase in thyroid cancer, even though there is linear increase in thyroid cancer risk with I-131 absorption at moderate doses.

== Public safety ==
Low-dose exposures, such as living near a nuclear power plant or a coal-fired power plant, which has higher emissions than nuclear plants, are generally believed to have no or very little effect on cancer development, barring accidents. Greater concerns include radon in buildings and overuse of medical imaging.

The International Commission on Radiological Protection (ICRP) recommends limiting artificial irradiation of the public to an average of 1 mSv (0.001 Sv) of effective dose per year, not including medical and occupational exposures. For comparison, radiation levels inside the US capitol building are 0.85 mSv/yr, close to the regulatory limit, because of the uranium content of the granite structure. According to the ICRP model, someone who spent 20 years inside the capitol building would have an extra one in a thousand chance of getting cancer, over and above any other existing risk. (20 yr × 0.85 mSv/yr × 0.001 Sv/mSv × 5.5%/Sv ≈ 0.1%) That "existing risk" is much higher; an average American would have a one in ten chance of getting cancer during this same 20-year period, even without any exposure to artificial radiation.

Internal contamination due to ingestion, inhalation, injection, or absorption is a particular concern because the radioactive material may stay in the body for an extended period of time, "committing" the subject to accumulating dose long after the initial exposure has ceased, albeit at low dose rates. Over a hundred people, including Eben Byers and the radium girls, have received committed doses in excess of 10 Gy and went on to die of cancer or natural causes, whereas the same amount of acute external dose would invariably cause an earlier death by acute radiation syndrome.

Internal exposure of the public is controlled by regulatory limits on the radioactive content of food and water. These limits are typically expressed in becquerel/kilogram, with different limits set for each contaminant.

== History ==
Although radiation was discovered in late 19th century, the dangers of radioactivity and of radiation were not immediately recognized. Acute effects of radiation were first observed in the use of X-rays when Wilhelm Röntgen intentionally subjected his fingers to X-rays in 1895. He published his observations concerning the burns that developed, though he attributed them to ozone rather than to X-rays. His injuries healed later.

The genetic effects of radiation, including the effects on cancer risk, were recognized much later. In 1927 Hermann Joseph Muller published research showing genetic effects, and in 1946 was awarded the Nobel Prize for his findings. Radiation was soon linked to bone cancer in the radium dial painters, but this was not confirmed until large-scale animal studies after World War II. The risk was then quantified through long-term studies of atomic bomb survivors.

Before the biological effects of radiation were known, many physicians and corporations had begun marketing radioactive substances as patent medicine and radioactive quackery. Examples were radium enema treatments, and radium-containing waters to be drunk as tonics. Marie Curie spoke out against this sort of treatment, warning that the effects of radiation on the human body were not well understood. Curie later died of aplastic anemia, not cancer. Eben Byers, a famous American socialite, died of multiple cancers in 1932 after consuming large quantities of radium over several years; his death drew public attention to dangers of radiation. By the 1930s, after a number of cases of bone necrosis and death in enthusiasts, radium-containing medical products had nearly vanished from the market.

In the United States, the experience of the so-called Radium Girls, where thousands of radium-dial painters contracted oral cancers, popularized the warnings of occupational health associated with radiation hazards. Robley D. Evans, at MIT, developed the first standard for permissible body burden of radium, a key step in the establishment of nuclear medicine as a field of study. With the development of nuclear reactors and nuclear weapons in the 1940s, heightened scientific attention was given to the study of all manner of radiation effects.
