= Absorbed dose =

Amount of energy deposited in matter by ionizing radiation

Absorbed dose of ionizing radiation
- Common symbols: D
- SI unit: gray
- Other units: rad
- In SI base units: J⋅kg^{−1}

Absorbed dose is a dose quantity which represents the specific energy (energy per unit mass) deposited by ionizing radiation in living matter. Absorbed dose is used in the calculation of dose uptake in living tissue in both radiation protection (reduction of harmful effects), and radiation oncology (potential beneficial effects, for example in cancer treatment). It is also used to directly compare the effect of radiation on inanimate matter such as in radiation hardening.

The SI unit of measure is the gray (Gy), which is defined as one joule of energy absorbed per kilogram of matter. The older, non-SI CGS unit rad, is sometimes also used, predominantly in the USA.

Summary of some radiation-related units

== Deterministic effects ==
Conventionally, in radiation protection, unmodified absorbed dose is only used for indicating the immediate health effects due to high levels of acute dose. These are tissue effects, such as in acute radiation syndrome, which are also known as deterministic effects. These are effects which are certain to happen in a short time. The time between exposure and vomiting may be used as a heuristic for quantifying a dose when more precise means of testing are unavailable.

=== Effects of acute radiation exposure ===
| Phase | Symptom | Whole-body absorbed dose (Gy) | | | | |
| Phase | Symptom | 1–2 Gy | 2–6 Gy | 6–8 Gy | 8–30 Gy | > 30 Gy |
|---|---|---|---|---|---|---|
| Immediate | Nausea and vomiting | 5–50% | 50–100% | 75–100% | 90–100% | 100% |
| Immediate | Time of onset | 2–6 h | 1–2 h | 10–60 min | < 10 min | Minutes |
| Immediate | Duration | < 24 h | 24–48 h | < 48 h | < 48 h | — (patients die in < 48 h) |
| Immediate | Diarrhea | None | None to mild (< 10%) | Heavy (> 10%) | Heavy (> 95%) | Heavy (100%) |
| Immediate | Time of onset | — | 3–8 h | 1–3 h | < 1 h | < 1 h |
| Immediate | Headache | Slight | Mild to moderate (50%) | Moderate (80%) | Severe (80–90%) | Severe (100%) |
| Immediate | Time of onset | — | 4–24 h | 3–4 h | 1–2 h | < 1 h |
| Immediate | Fever | None | Moderate increase (10–100%) | Moderate to severe (100%) | Severe (100%) | Severe (100%) |
| Immediate | Time of onset | — | 1–3 h | < 1 h | < 1 h | < 1 h |
| Immediate | CNS function | No impairment | Cognitive impairment 6–20 h | Cognitive impairment > 24 h | Rapid incapacitation | Seizures, tremor, ataxia, lethargy |
| Latent period | | 28–31 days | 7–28 days | < 7 days | None | None |
| Illness | | Mild to moderate leukopenia Fatigue; Weakness | Moderate to severe leukopenia Purpura; Hemorrhage; Infections; Alopecia after 3 Gy | Severe leukopenia High fever Diarrhea; Vomiting; Dizziness and disorientation Hypotension; Electrolyte disturbance | Nausea; Vomiting; Severe diarrhea High fever Electrolyte disturbance Shock | — (patients die in < 48h) |
| Mortality | Without care | 0–5% | 5–95% | 95–100% | 100% | 100% |
| Mortality | With care | 0–5% | 5–50% | 50–100% | 99–100% | 100% |
| Mortality | Death | 6–8 weeks | 4–6 weeks | 2–4 weeks | 2 days – 2 weeks | 1–2 days |
Table source

== Radiation therapy ==
=== Dose computation ===
The absorbed dose is equal to the radiation exposure (ions or C/kg) of the radiation beam multiplied by the ionization energy of the medium to be ionized.

For example, the ionization energy of dry air at 20 °C and 101.325 kPa of pressure is 33.97±0.05 J/C. (33.97 eV per ion pair) Therefore, an exposure of 2.58×10^{−4} C/kg (1 roentgen) would deposit an absorbed dose of 8.76×10^{−3} J/kg (0.00876 Gy or 0.876 rad) in dry air at those conditions.

When the absorbed dose is not uniform, or when it is only applied to a portion of a body or object, an absorbed dose representative of the entire item can be calculated by taking a mass-weighted average of the absorbed doses at each point.

More precisely,

$$\overline{D}_T = \frac{\displaystyle \int_{T} D(x,y,z) \, \rho(x,y,z) \, dV} {\displaystyle \int_{T} \rho(x,y,z) \, dV}$$

Where

- $\overline{D}_T$ is the mass-averaged absorbed dose of the entire item $T$;
- $T$ is the item of interest;
- $D(x,y,z)$ is the absorbed dose density (absorbed dose per unit volume) as a function of location;
- $\rho(x,y,z)$ is the density (mass per unit volume) as a function of location;
- $V$ is volume.

== Stochastic risk - conversion to equivalent dose ==
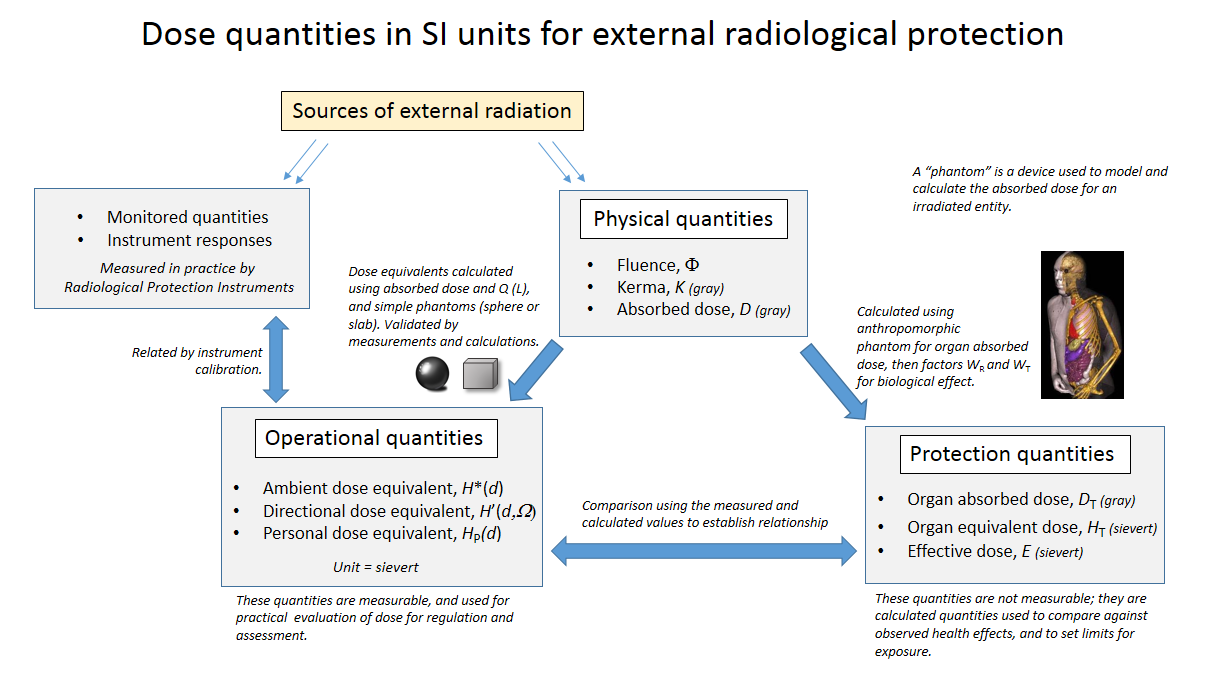
External dose quantities used in radiation protection and dosimetry

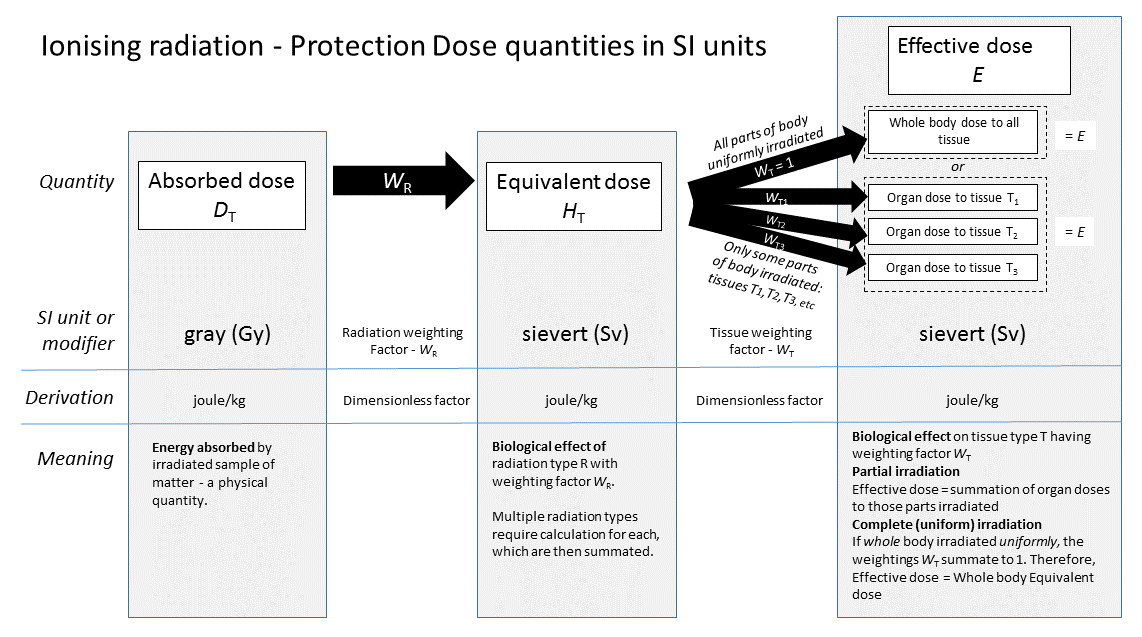
Graphic showing relationship of "protection dose" quantities in SI units

For stochastic radiation risk, defined as the probability of cancer induction and genetic effects occurring over a long time scale, consideration must be given to the type of radiation and the sensitivity of the irradiated tissues, which requires the use of modifying factors to produce a risk factor in sieverts. One sievert carries with it a 5.5% chance of eventually developing cancer based on the linear no-threshold model. This calculation starts with the absorbed dose.

To represent stochastic risk the dose quantities equivalent dose H_{T} and effective dose E are used, and appropriate dose factors and coefficients are used to calculate these from the absorbed dose. Equivalent and effective dose quantities are expressed in units of the sievert or rem which implies that biological effects have been taken into account. The derivation of stochastic risk is in accordance with the recommendations of the International Committee on Radiation Protection (ICRP) and International Commission on Radiation Units and Measurements (ICRU). The coherent system of radiological protection quantities developed by them is shown in the accompanying diagram.

For whole body radiation, with Gamma rays or X-rays the modifying factors are numerically equal to 1, which means that in that case the dose in grays equals the dose in sieverts.

== Development of the absorbed dose concept and the gray ==
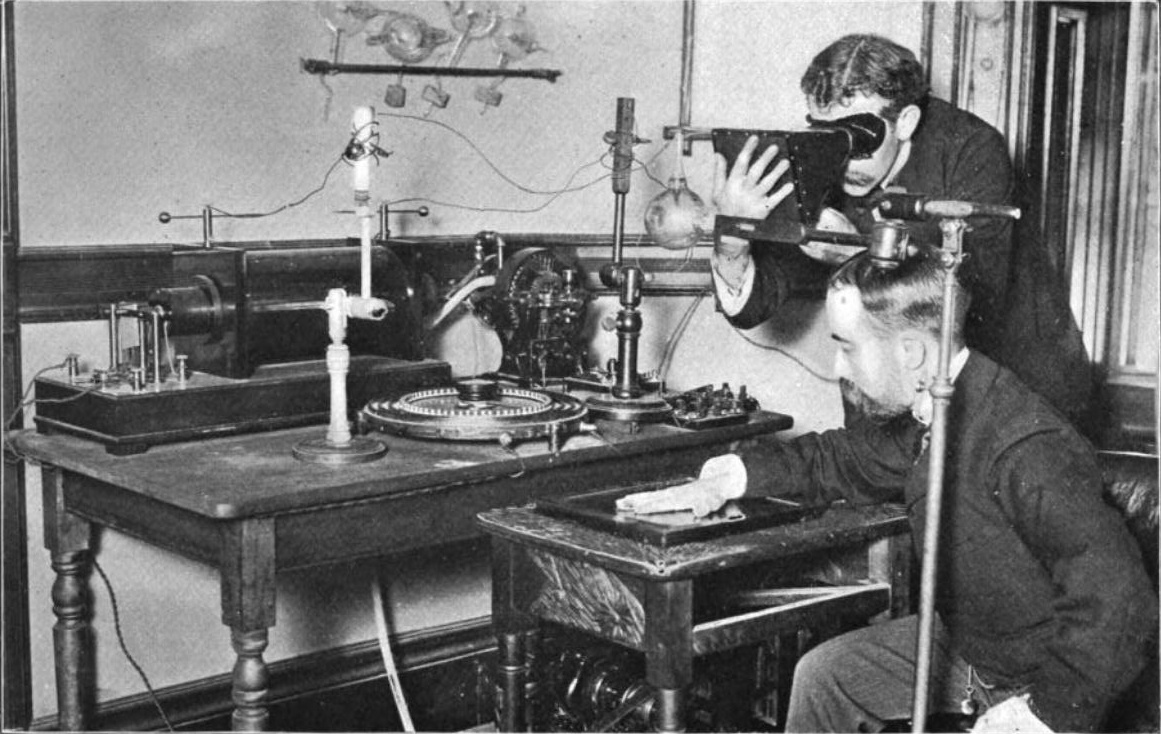
Using early Crookes tube X-Ray apparatus in 1896. One man is viewing his hand with a fluoroscope to optimise tube emissions, the other has his head close to the tube. No precautions are being taken.

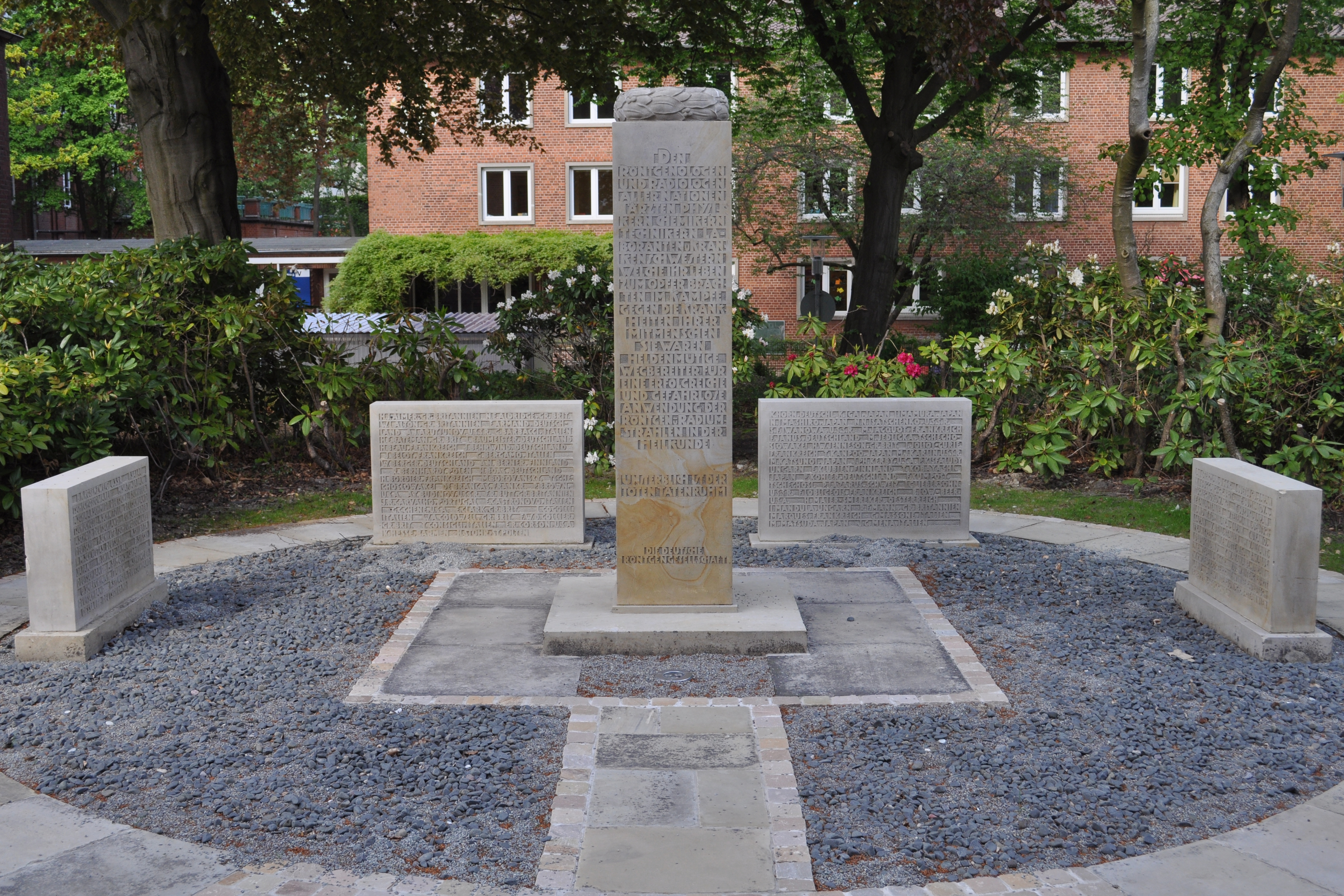
The Radiology Martyrs monument, erected 1936 at St. Georg hospital in Hamburg, more names added in 1959.

Wilhelm Röntgen first discovered X-rays on November 8, 1895, and their use spread very quickly for medical diagnostics, particularly broken bones and embedded foreign objects where they were a revolutionary improvement over previous techniques.

Due to the wide use of X-rays and the growing realisation of the dangers of ionizing radiation, measurement standards became necessary for radiation intensity and various countries developed their own, but using differing definitions and methods. Eventually, in order to promote international standardisation, the first International Congress of Radiology (ICR) meeting in London in 1925, proposed a separate body to consider units of measure. This was called the International Commission on Radiation Units and Measurements, or ICRU, (Note: Originally known as the International X-ray Unit Committee) and came into being at the Second ICR in Stockholm in 1928, under the chairmanship of Manne Siegbahn. (Note: The host country nominated the chairman of the early ICRU meetings.)

One of the earliest techniques of measuring the intensity of X-rays was to measure their ionising effect in air by means of an air-filled ion chamber. At the first ICRU meeting it was proposed that one unit of X-ray dose should be defined as the quantity of X-rays that would produce one esu of charge in one cubic centimetre of dry air at 0 °C and 1 standard atmosphere of pressure. This unit of radiation exposure was named the roentgen in honour of Wilhelm Röntgen, who had died five years previously. At the 1937 meeting of the ICRU, this definition was extended to apply to gamma radiation. This approach, although a great step forward in standardisation, had the disadvantage of not being a direct measure of the absorption of radiation, and thereby the ionisation effect, in various types of matter including human tissue, and was a measurement only of the effect of the X-rays in a specific circumstance; the ionisation effect in dry air.

In 1940, Louis Harold Gray, who had been studying the effect of neutron damage on human tissue, together with William Valentine Mayneord and the radiobiologist John Read, published a paper in which a new unit of measure, dubbed the "gram roentgen" (symbol: gr) was proposed, and defined as "that amount of neutron radiation which produces an increment in energy in unit volume of tissue equal to the increment of energy produced in unit volume of water by one roentgen of radiation". This unit was found to be equivalent to 88 ergs in air, and made the absorbed dose, as it subsequently became known, dependent on the interaction of the radiation with the irradiated material, not just an expression of radiation exposure or intensity, which the roentgen represented. In 1953 the ICRU recommended the rad, equal to 100 erg/g, as the new unit of measure of absorbed radiation. The rad was expressed in coherent cgs units.

In the late 1950s, the CGPM invited the ICRU to join other scientific bodies to work on the development of the International System of Units, or SI. It was decided to define the SI unit of absorbed radiation as energy deposited per unit mass which is how the rad had been defined, but in MKS units it would be J/kg. This was confirmed in 1975 by the 15th CGPM, and the unit was named the "gray" in honour of Louis Harold Gray, who had died in 1965. The gray was equal to 100 rad, the cgs unit.

== Other uses ==
Absorbed dose is also used to manage the irradiation and measure the effects of ionising radiation on inanimate matter in a number of fields.

=== Component survivability ===
Absorbed dose is used to rate the survivability of devices such as electronic components in ionizing radiation environments.

=== Radiation hardening ===
The measurement of absorbed dose absorbed by inanimate matter is vital in the process of radiation hardening which improves the resistance of electronic devices to radiation effects.

=== Food irradiation ===
Absorbed dose is the physical dose quantity used to ensure irradiated food has received the correct dose to ensure effectiveness. Variable doses are used depending on the application and can be as high as 70 kGy.

== Radiation-related quantities ==
The following table shows radiation quantities in SI and non-SI units:

Ionizing radiation related quantities
| Quantity | Unit | Symbol | Derivation | Year | SI equivalent |
|---|---|---|---|---|---|
| Activity (A) | becquerel | Bq | s^{−1} | 1974 | SI unit |
| Activity (A) | curie | Ci | 3.7×10^{10} s^{−1} | 1953 | 3.7×10^{10} Bq |
| Activity (A) | rutherford | Rd | 10^{6} s^{−1} | 1946 | 1000000 Bq |
| Exposure (X) | coulomb per kilogram | C/kg | C⋅kg^{−1} of air | 1974 | SI unit |
| Exposure (X) | röntgen | R | esu / 0.001293 g of air | 1928 | 2.58×10^{−4} C/kg |
| Absorbed dose (D) | gray | Gy | J⋅kg^{−1} | 1974 | SI unit |
| Absorbed dose (D) | erg per gram | erg/g | erg⋅g^{−1} | 1950 | 1.0×10^{−4} Gy |
| Absorbed dose (D) | rad | rad | 100 erg⋅g^{−1} | 1953 | 0.010 Gy |
| Equivalent dose (H) | sievert | Sv | J⋅kg^{−1} × W_{R} | 1977 | SI unit |
| Equivalent dose (H) | röntgen equivalent man | rem | 100 erg⋅g^{−1} × W_{R} | 1971 | 0.010 Sv |
| Effective dose (E) | sievert | Sv | J⋅kg^{−1} × W_{R} × W_{T} | 1977 | SI unit |
| Effective dose (E) | röntgen equivalent man | rem | 100 erg⋅g^{−1} × W_{R} × W_{T} | 1971 | 0.010 Sv |

Although the United States Nuclear Regulatory Commission permits the use of the units curie, rad, and rem alongside SI units, the European Union European units of measurement directives required that their use for "public health ... purposes" be phased out by 31 December 1985.

== See also ==
- Kerma (physics)
- Mean glandular dose
- Category:Units of radiation dose

== Literature ==
- ICRP (2007). "The 2007 Recommendations of the International Commission on Radiological Protection". Annals of the ICRP. ICRP publication 103. 37 (2–4). ISBN 978-0-7020-3048-2.
