= Cumulative dose =

Cumulative dose is the total dose resulting from repeated exposures of ionizing radiation to an occupationally exposed worker to the same portion of the body, or to the whole body, over a period of time.

In medicine, cumulative dose is the total amount of a drug or radiation given to a patient over time; for example, the total dose of radiation given in a series of radiation treatments or imaging exams. Recent studies have drawn attention to high cumulative doses (>100 mSv) to millions of patients undergoing recurrent CT scans during a 1- to 5-year period. This has resulted in a debate on whether CT is really a low-dose imaging modality.

== See also ==
- Radioactivity
- Radiation poisoning
- Collective dose
- Committed dose equivalent
- Committed effective dose equivalent
