= F-factor =

F-factor may refer to:

- F-factor (conversion factor), a conversion unit used in diagnostic radiology
- Fertility factor (bacteria), a sequence of bacterial DNA
- F-Factor (diet)
