= Jupiter Icy Moons Explorer =

European mission to study Jupiter and its moons since 2023

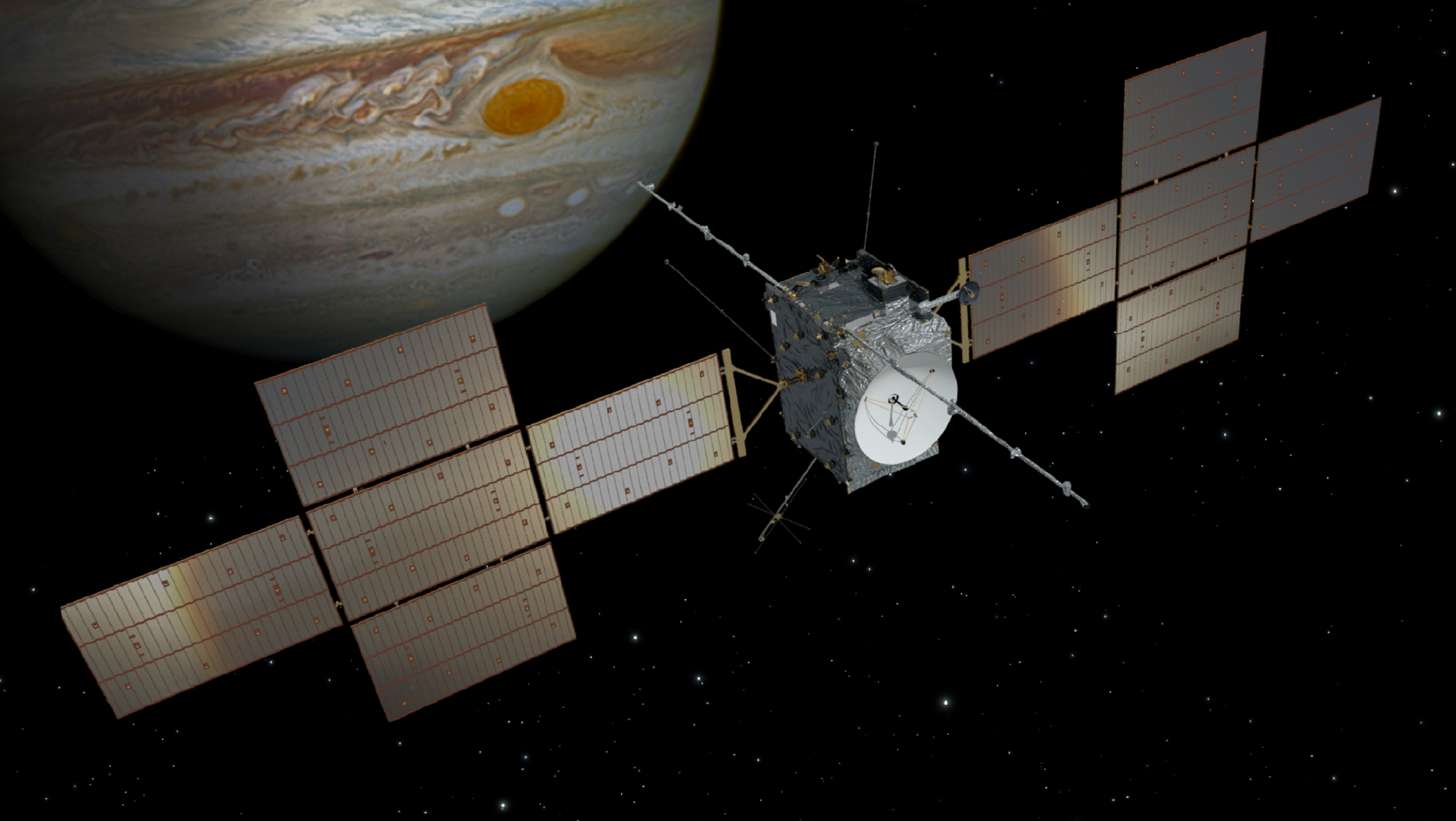
- Artist's impression of Juice orbiting Jupiter
- Names: Juice
- Mission type: Jupiter orbiter
- Operator: European Space Agency
- COSPAR ID: 2023-053A
- SATCAT no.: 56176
- Website: Official website
- Mission duration: Cruise phase: 8 years; Science phase: 3.5 years; Elapsed: 3 years, 6 months, 25 days

Spacecraft properties
- Manufacturer: Airbus Defence and Space
- Launch mass: 6,070 kg (13,380 lb)
- Dry mass: 2,420 kg (5,340 lb)
- Dimensions: 16.8 × 27.1 × 13.7 meters
- Power: 850 watts

Start of mission
- Launch date: 14 April 2023 12:14:36 UTC
- Rocket: Ariane 5 ECA+ (VA-260)
- Launch site: Kourou ELA-3
- Contractor: Arianespace

Flyby of Moon
- Closest approach: 19 August 2024, 21:16 UTC
- Distance: 700 km (430 mi)

Flyby of Earth
- Closest approach: 20 August 2024, 21:57 UTC
- Distance: 6,807 km (4,230 mi)

Flyby of Venus
- Closest approach: 31 August 2025, 05:28 UTC
- Distance: 5,088 km (3,162 mi)

Flyby of Earth
- Closest approach: 28 September 2026 11:45 UTC
- Distance: 8,641 km (5,369 mi)

Flyby of Earth
- Closest approach: 18 January 2029
- Distance: 4,600 km (2,900 mi)

Jupiter orbiter
- Orbital insertion: July 2031 (planned)
- Orbital departure: December 2034 (planned)

Ganymede orbiter
- Orbital insertion: December 2034 (planned)

Orbital parameters
- Periapsis altitude: 500 km (310 mi)
- Apoapsis altitude: 500 km (310 mi)
Instruments
- GALA: GAnymede Laser Altimeter
- JANUS: Jovis, Amorum ac Natorum Undique Scrutator
- J-MAG: Juice-MAGnetometer
- MAJIS: Moons And Jupiter Imaging Spectrometer
- PEP: Particle Environment Package
- RIME: Radar for Icy Moons Exploration
- RPWI: Radio and Plasma Wave Investigation
- SWI: Sub-millimeter Wave Instrument
- UVS: UV imaging Spectrograph
- 3GM: Gravity and Geophysics of Jupiter and Galilean Moons
- ESA insignia Cosmic Vision (Science Programme)

The Jupiter Icy Moons Explorer (Juice, formerly JUICE) is an interplanetary spacecraft developed by the European Space Agency (ESA). It is on its way to orbit and study three icy moons of Jupiter: Ganymede, Callisto, and Europa. These planetary-mass moons are targets for study because they are thought to have significant bodies of liquid water beneath their frozen surfaces, which would make them potentially habitable for extraterrestrial life.

Juice is the first interplanetary spacecraft to the outer Solar System planets not launched by the United States and the first intended to orbit a moon other than Earth's Moon. Launched by ESA, from Guiana Space Centre in French Guiana on 14 April 2023, with Airbus Defence and Space as the main contractor, it is expected to reach Jupiter in July 2031 after four gravity assists and eight years of travel. In December 2034, the spacecraft will enter orbit around Ganymede for its close-up science mission. Its period of operations will overlap with NASA's Europa Clipper mission, which was launched in October 2024.

== Background ==
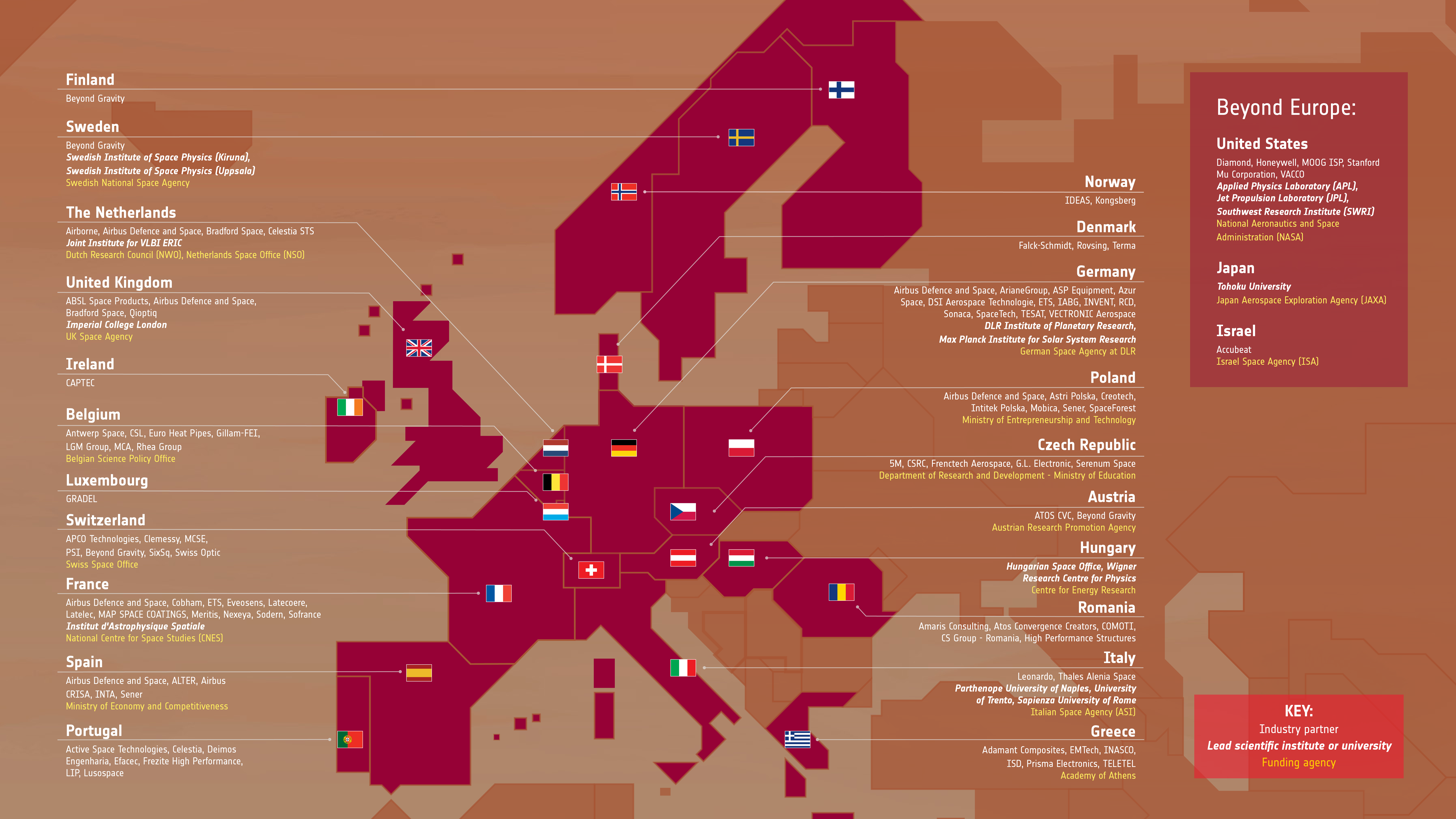
Industry partners and the lead scientific institutes or universities that have contributed to Juice

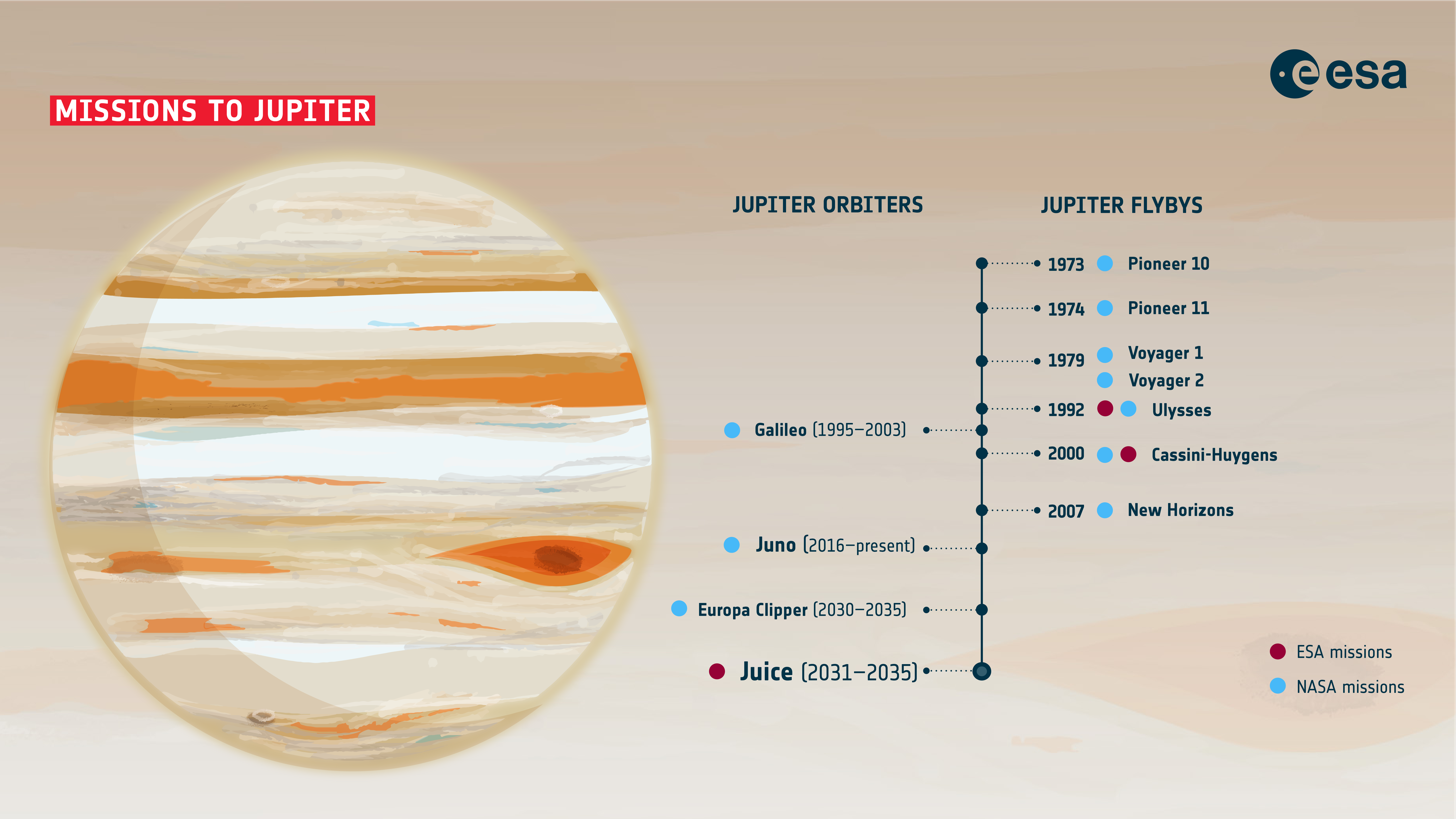
ESA and NASA missions that have visited or will visit Jupiter

The mission started as a reformulation of the Jupiter Ganymede Orbiter proposal, which was to be ESA's component of the cancelled Europa Jupiter System Mission – Laplace (EJSM-Laplace). It became a candidate for the first L-class (Large) mission (L1) of the ESA Cosmic Vision Programme, and its selection was announced on 2 May 2012.

In April 2012, Juice was recommended over the proposed X-ray telescope ATHENA and the gravitational wave observatory LISA (under the older name NGO). Both unsuccessful mission proposals were selected later and are under development as of 2025.

In July 2015, Airbus Defence and Space was selected as the prime contractor to design and build the probe, to be assembled in Toulouse, France. In 2024, Airbus Defence and Space received the Excellence Award from ESA for their work on Juice. By 2023, the mission was estimated to cost ESA 1.5 billion euros ($1.6 billion).

== Spacecraft ==
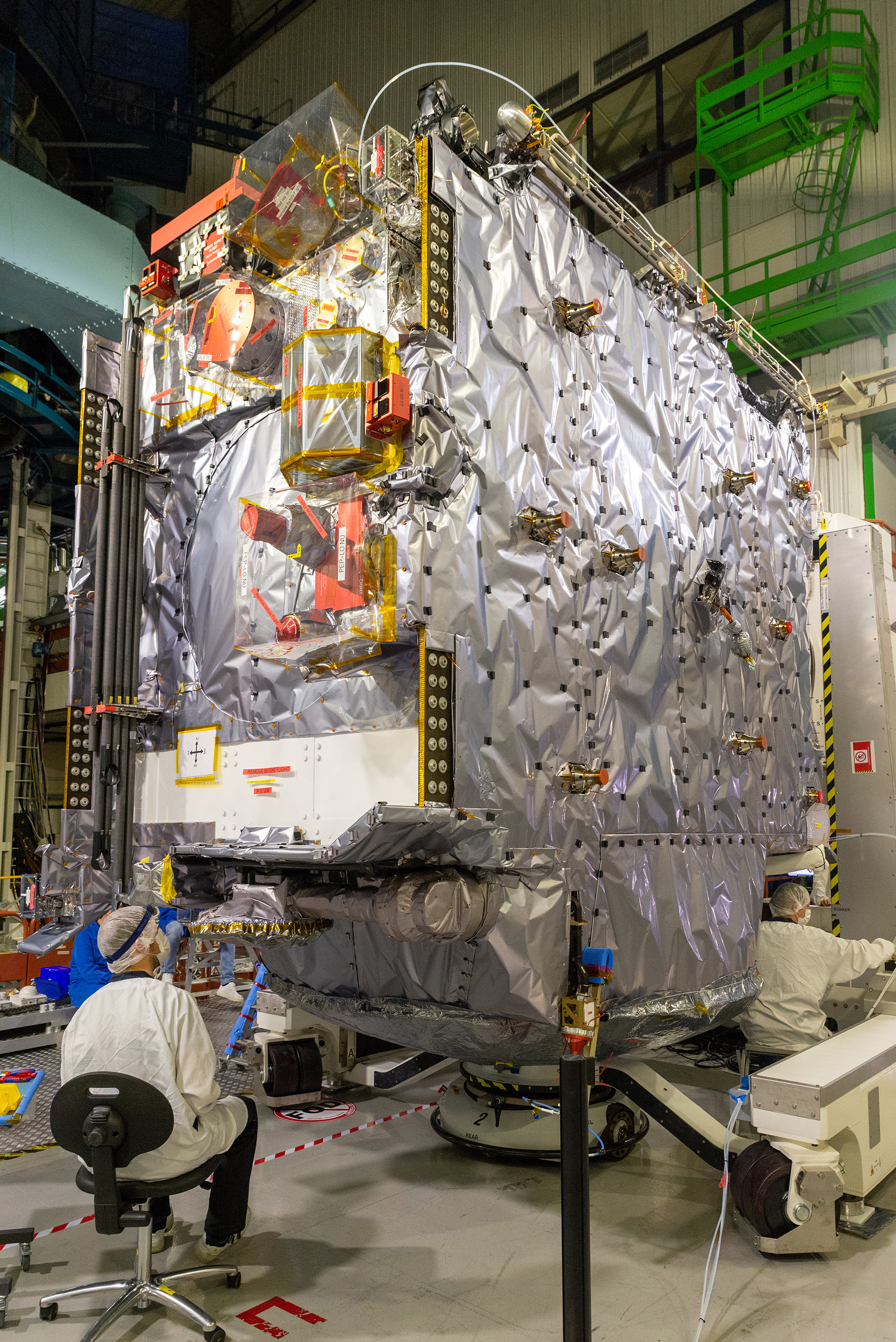
Juice in Airbus Astrolabe facilities, 2023

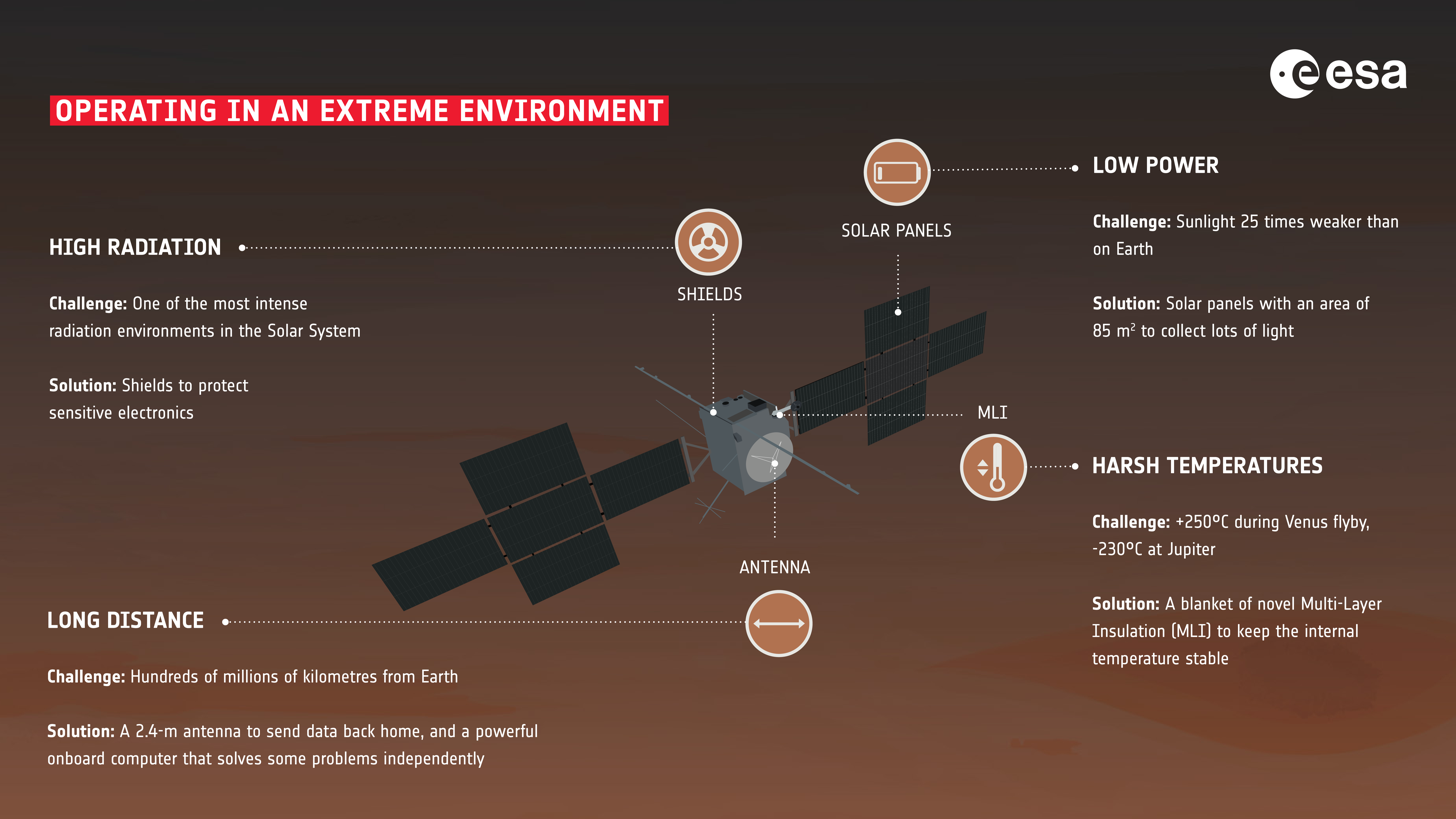
Jupiter's extreme environment (ESA infographic)

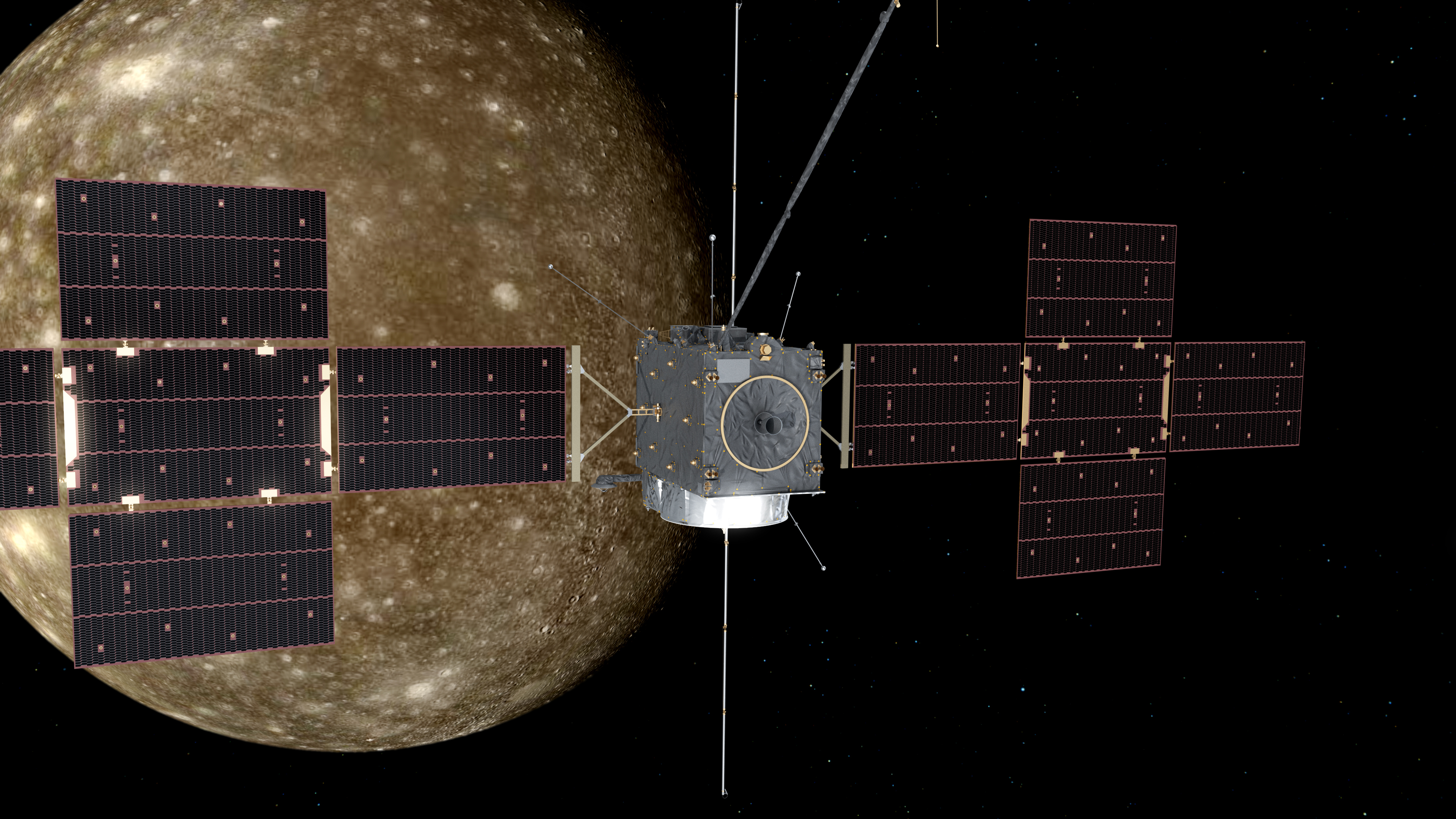
Juice flyby of Callisto (artist's impression)

The main spacecraft design drivers are related to the large distance to the Sun, the use of solar power, and Jupiter's harsh radiation environment. The orbit insertions at Jupiter and Ganymede and the large number of flyby manoeuvres (more than 25 gravity assists, and two Europa flybys) require the spacecraft to carry about 3,000 kg (6,600 lb) of chemical propellant. The total delta-V capability of the spacecraft is about 2,700 m/s (6,000 mph).

Juice has a fixed 2.5 meter diameter high-gain antenna and a steerable medium-gain antenna; both X- and K-band will be used. Downlink rates of 2 Gb/day are possible with ground-based Deep Space Antennas. On-board data storage capability is 1.25 Tb.

The Juice main engine is a hypergolic bi-propellant (mono-methyl hydrazine and mixed oxides of nitrogen) 425 N thruster. A 100 kg multilayer insulation provides thermal control. The spacecraft is 3-axis stabilized using momentum wheels. Radiation shielding is used to protect onboard electronics from the Jovian environment (the required radiation tolerance is 50 kilorad at equipment level).

The Juice science payload has a mass of 280 kilograms (620 lb) and includes the JANUS camera system, the MAJIS visible and infrared imaging spectrometer, the UVS ultraviolet imaging spectrograph, RIME radar sounder, GALA laser altimeter, SWI submillimetre wave instrument, J-MAG magnetometer, PEP particle and plasma package, RPWI radio and plasma wave investigation, 3GM radio science package, the PRIDE radio science instrument, and the RADEM radiation monitor.

A 10.6 meters (35 ft) deployable boom will hold J-MAG and RPWI, a 16 meters (52 ft) long deployable antenna will be used for RIME. Four 3 meters (9.8 ft) booms carry parts of the RPWI instrument. The other instruments are mounted on the spacecraft body, or for 3GM, within the spacecraft bus.

== Mission timeline ==
=== Launch ===
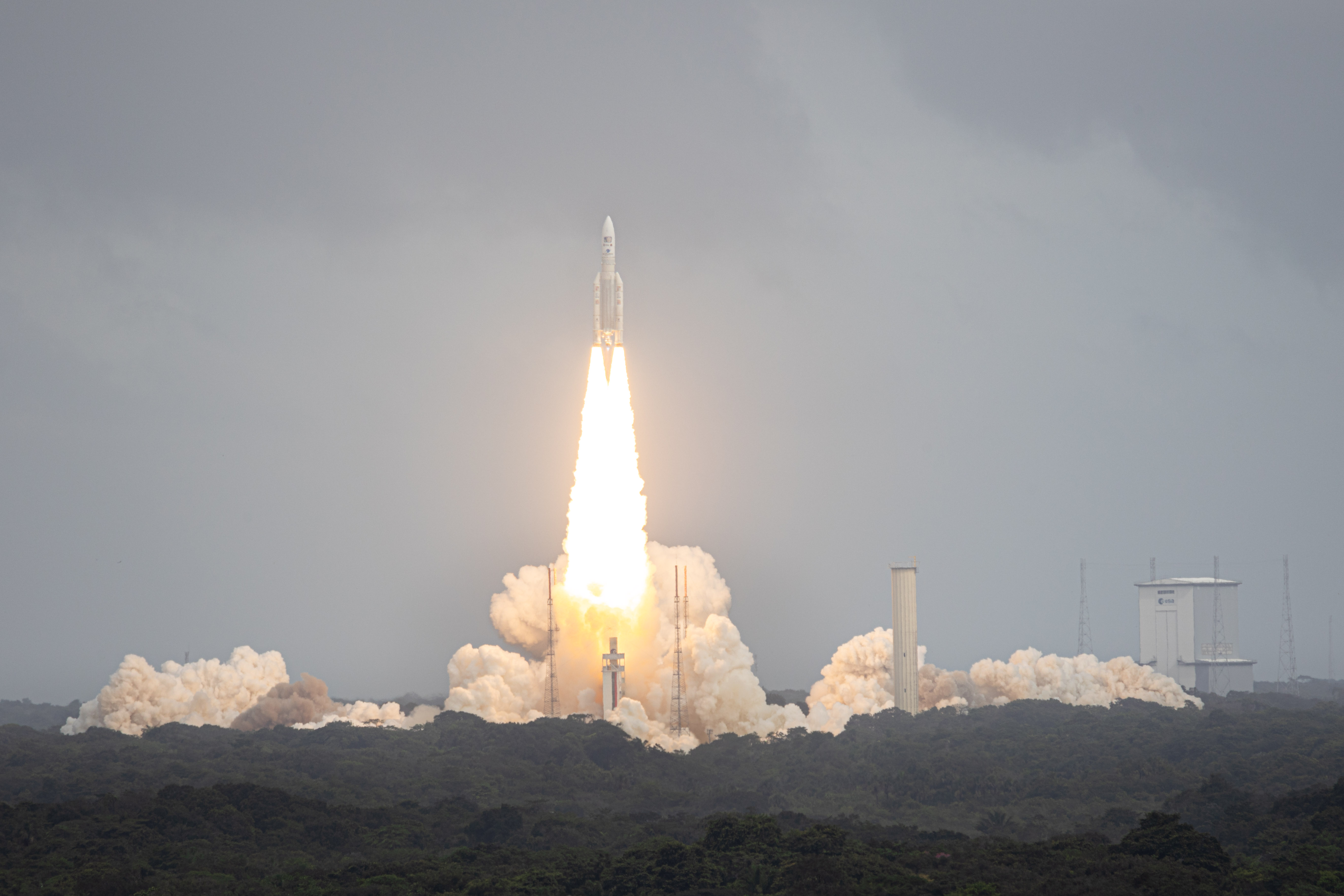
Ariane 5 launch of Juice

Juice's RIME antenna deploys

Juice was launched into space on 14 April 2023 from the Guiana Space Centre on an Ariane 5 rocket. This was the final launch of an ESA science mission using the Ariane 5 vehicle, and the second to last launch of the rocket overall.

The launch was originally scheduled for 13 April 2023, but due to poor weather the launch was postponed. The next day a second launch attempt succeeded, with liftoff occurring at 12:14:36 UTC. After the spacecraft separated from the rocket, it established a successful radio signal connection with the ground at 13:04 UTC. Juice's solar arrays were deployed about half an hour later, prompting ESA to deem the launch a success.

During post-launch commissioning of the spacecraft, the RIME antenna failed to properly deploy from its mounting bracket. After several weeks of attempts to free the instrument, it was successfully deployed on 12 May of the same year.

=== Earth–Moon system flyby ===
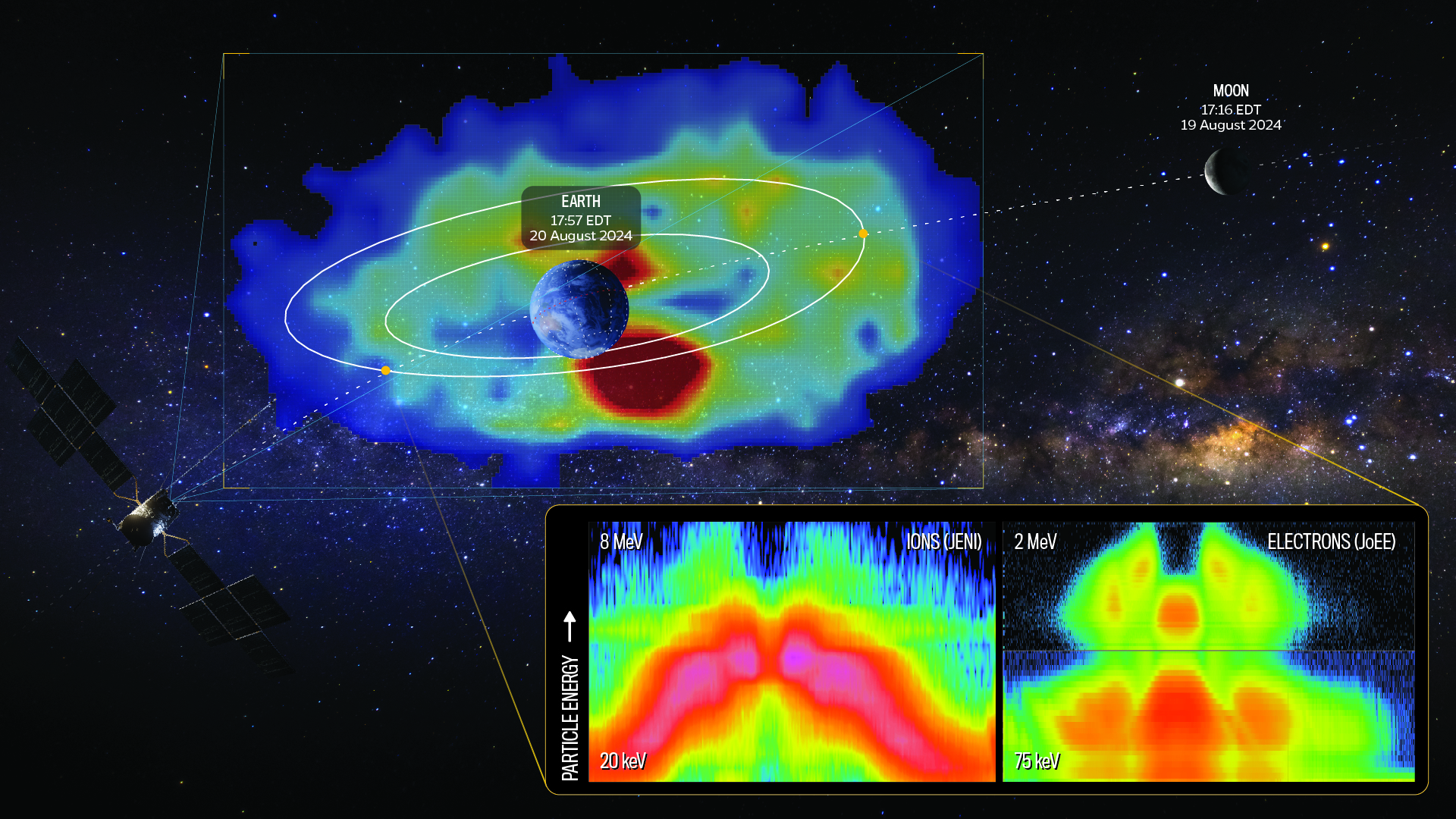
Juice images the particle cloud around Earth during the 2024 flyby

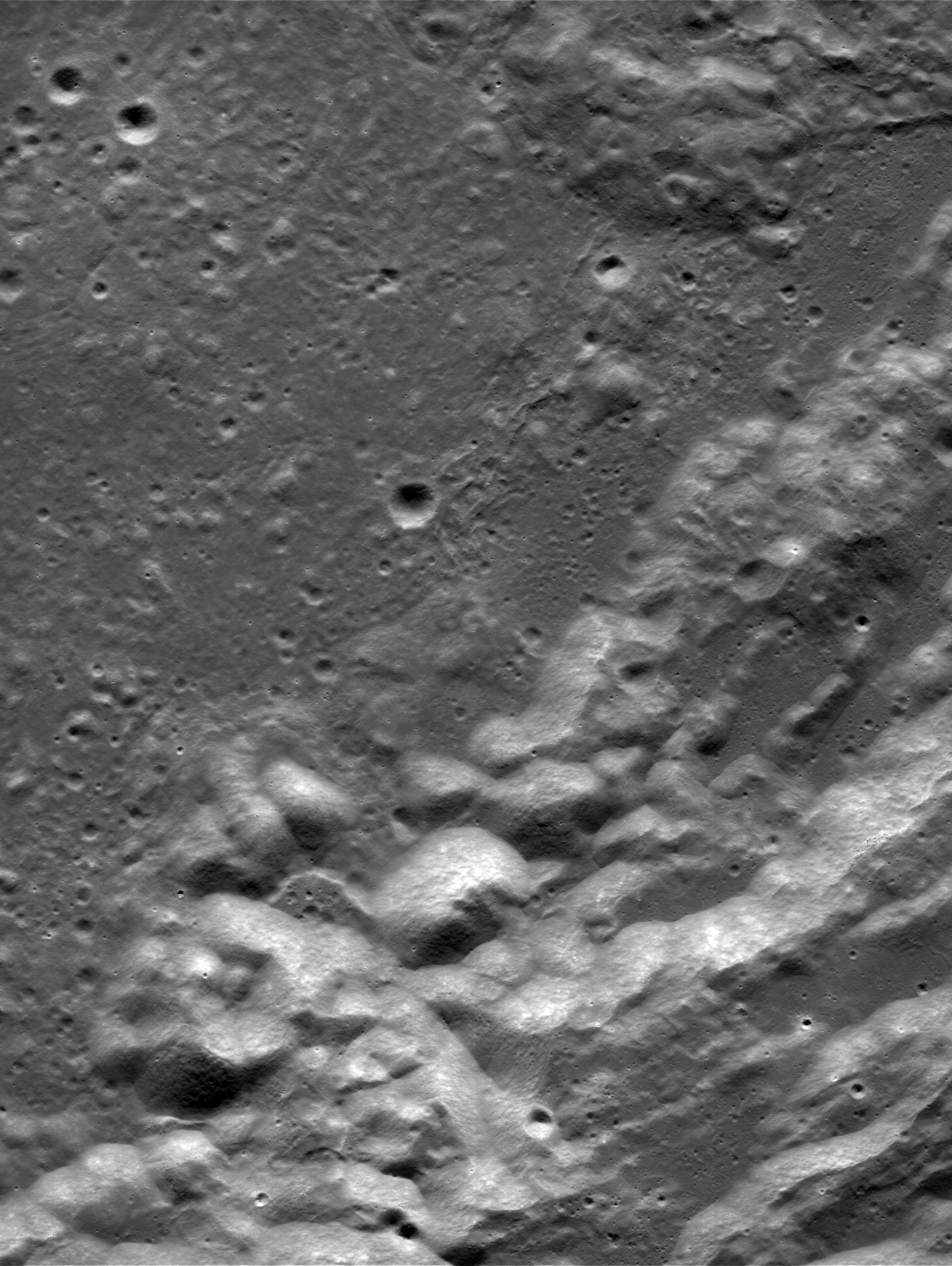
JANUS view of the Moon, 2024

In August 2024, Juice performed its first gravity assist when it flew by the Moon and then Earth, becoming the first ever spacecraft to perform such maneuver using both bodies. The closest approach to the Moon happened at 21:15 UTC on 19 August. This increased the spacecraft's speed by 0.9 km/s relative to the Sun, sending it towards Earth. The closest approach to Earth happened at 21:56 UTC on 20 August. This reduced the spacecraft's speed by 4.8 km/s relative to the Sun, sending it towards Venus for the next gravity assist planned for August 2025. This double gravity assist saved the spacecraft up to 150 kg of fuel and deflected it by an angle of 100° compared to its path before the flyby.

During this maneuver, Juice tested many of its scientific instruments. All 10 instruments were active during the Moon flyby, and eight during the Earth flyby. The JANUS camera took high-resolution images of the Moon and Earth. The MAJIS and SWI instruments detected the expected chemical signatures of habitability on Earth and MAJIS also provided information-rich temperature maps of Earth. Two sensors of the Particle Environment Package (PEP) took pictures and in situ measurements of the charged particle cloud surrounding Earth. The RIME radar sounder captured a radargram image of the patch of the lunar surface that is also visible in the famous Earthrise photo, taken in 1968 during the Apollo 8 mission.

=== Venus flyby ===
On 16 July 2025, during a time-sensitive period before the planned Venus flyby, Juice experienced a communication anomaly that temporarily severed the spacecraft's contact with Earth. After almost 20 hours of recovery efforts, ESOC and Airbus managed to resolve the issue and identified its root cause related to a scheduled restart of the spacecraft's internal timer. Plans for the flyby remained unchanged and Juice successfully flew by Venus on 31 August 2025, with the closest approach of 5,088 km above Venus's surface at 05:28 UTC, performing a gravity assist maneuver that increased its velocity by 5.1 km/s and sent it towards its second Earth flyby planned for September 2026. Due to thermal constraints (solar flux of 3,000 W/m^{2} near Venus versus 50 W/m^{2} near Jupiter), no imaging or scientific observations were planned for the Venus flyby and the spacecraft used its high-gain antenna as a thermal shield, pointing it toward the Sun.

=== 3I/ATLAS observations ===
The interstellar comet 3I/ATLAS, discovered in July 2025 as only the third known interstellar object in the Solar System, made its closest approach to the Sun in October 2025. However, this part of its trajectory, when it was expected to show strong cometary activity, was not visible from Earth-based telescopes as it occurred on the other side of the Sun. In September 2025, ESA expected that of all its interplanetary spacecraft, Juice would have the best conditions for observing the object during its close approach to the Sun.

ESA commanded Juice to attempt observing 3I/ATLAS in November 2025, at a distance of 0.428 AU, using its cameras, spectrometers, and a particle sensor. ESA was also considering coordinating ultraviolet spectrograph observations with NASA's Europa Clipper. Because Juice had to point its high-gain antenna towards the Sun to act as a heat shield during its travel through the inner Solar System, known as "hot-cruise phase", the data from these observations were not expected to reach Earth before February 2026. The commands for the observations were prepared at ESOC.

The observations were conducted between 2 and 25 November 2025. Thermal constraints were expected to limit the observations to no more than 30 minutes per day with the exception of the Particle Environment Package (PEP) which was commanded to operate for twelve days straight. The final observation schedule included six 45-minute slots and one final 4-hour slot. The observations generated 11.18 Gbits of data. The closest approach between the comet and the spacecraft happened on 4 November 2025.

In early December 2025, ESA released a preliminary picture of 3I/ATLAS taken on 2 November 2025 by Juice's Navigation Camera (NavCam). The photo included the comet's coma as well as the plasma and dust tails. The spacecraft entered the "cold-cruise phase" of its flight in mid-January 2026 and the observation data from five instruments—JANUS, MAJIS, SWI, PEP, and UVS—arrived on Earth in two 11-hour passes on 17 and 20 February 2026 via ESTRACK's antennas in New Norcia and Malargüe. The 3I/ATLAS observation campaign officially ended on 20 February 2026 at 18:21 UTC. ESA released the first one of more than 120 images of 3I/ATLAS taken by the JANUS camera system on 26 February 2026.

On 2 April 2026, ESA released first preliminary scientific results from the observations. The MAJIS instrument measured that on 2 November 2025, 3I/ATLAS was releasing 2000 kg of water per second and this amount hadn't diminished significantly in observations 10 days later, on 12 November 2025. The SWI instrument detected that most of the water was being released from the Sun-facing side of the comet and a substantial part of it came from icy dust grains of the coma, and not directly from the nucleus. The UVS images also revealed that the gas and dust from the comet stretched at least 5 million km from the nucleus. The JANUS images revealed faint structures within the comet's coma and two tails.

In early March 2026, when Juice no longer needed to use its high‑gain antenna as a Sun shield, ESOC performed a series of planned pointing checkout tests on the spacecraft's instruments, software updates, operations exercises, and commissioning activities.

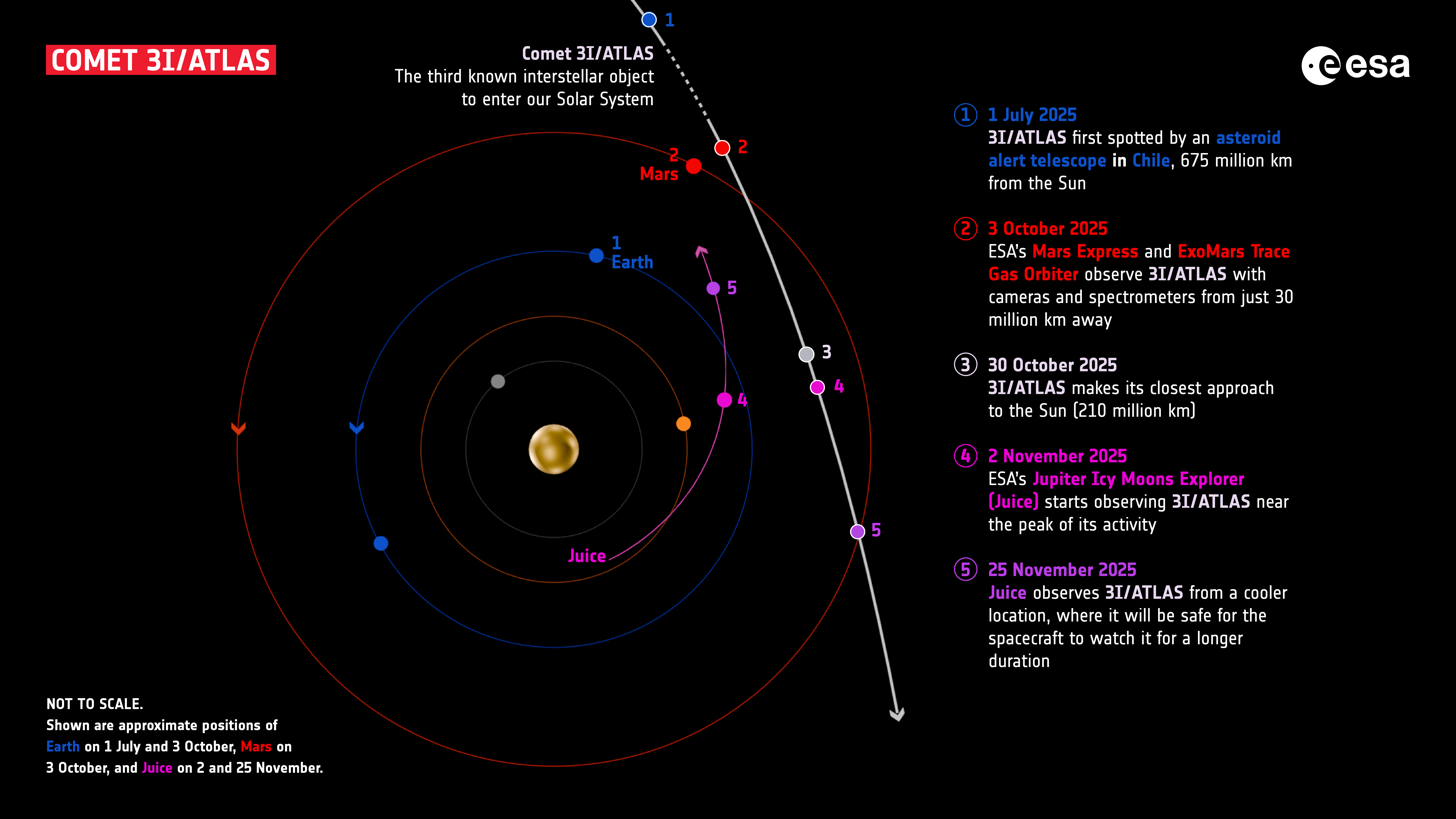
ESA's plans for 3I/ATLAS observations by space probes, September 2025

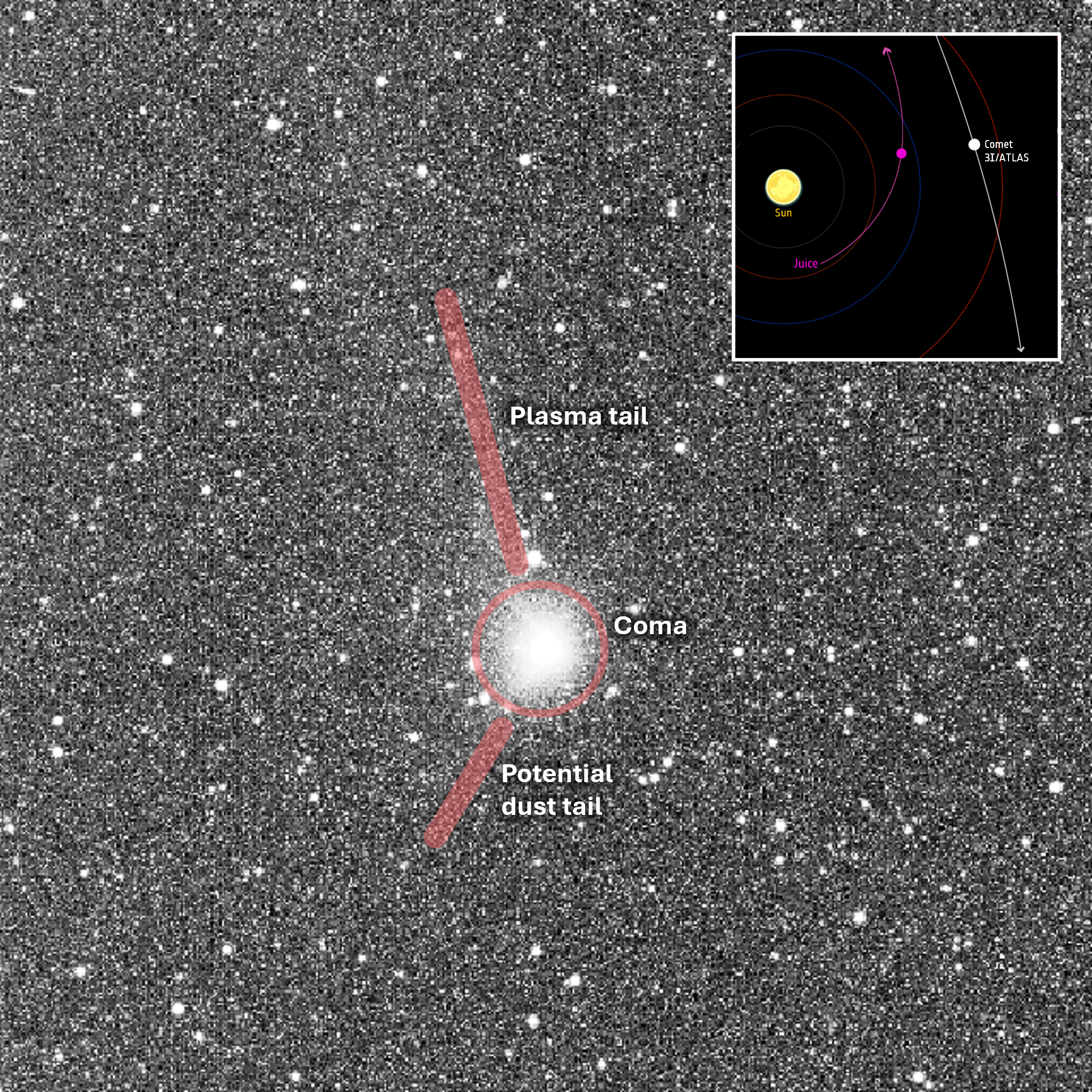
3I/ATLAS by NavCam

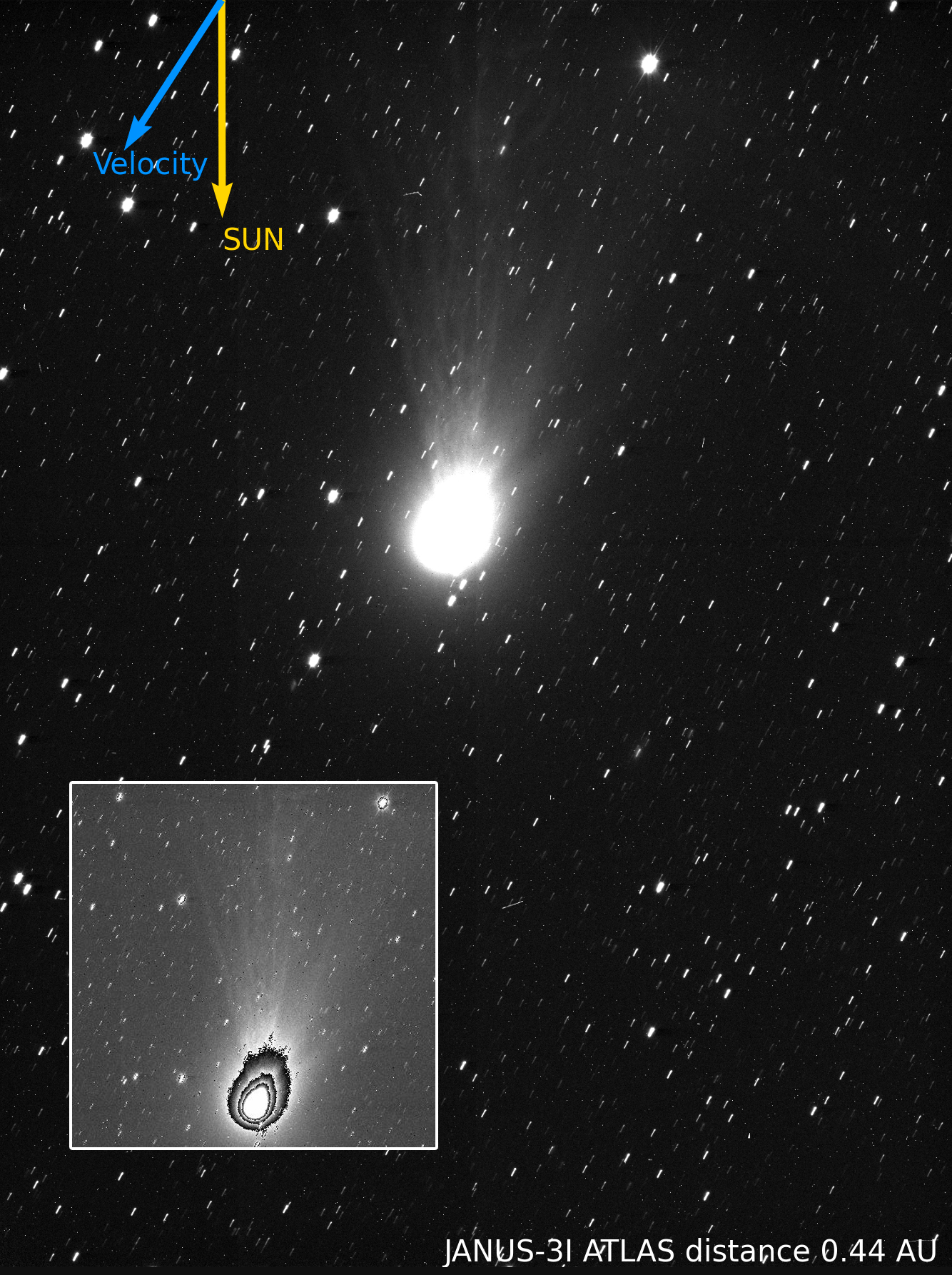
3I/ATLAS by JANUS

3I/ATLAS by JANUS, 5 November 2025

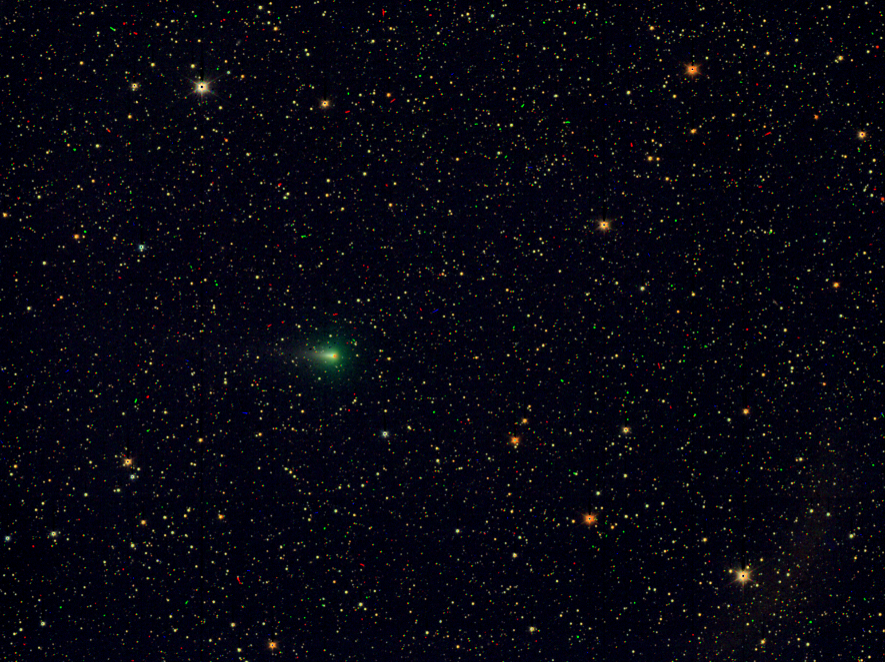
3I/ATLAS by JANUS (red-green-blue)

3I/ATLAS by JANUS (red and violet filters)

3I/ATLAS by NavCam

=== Kallichore flyby decision ===
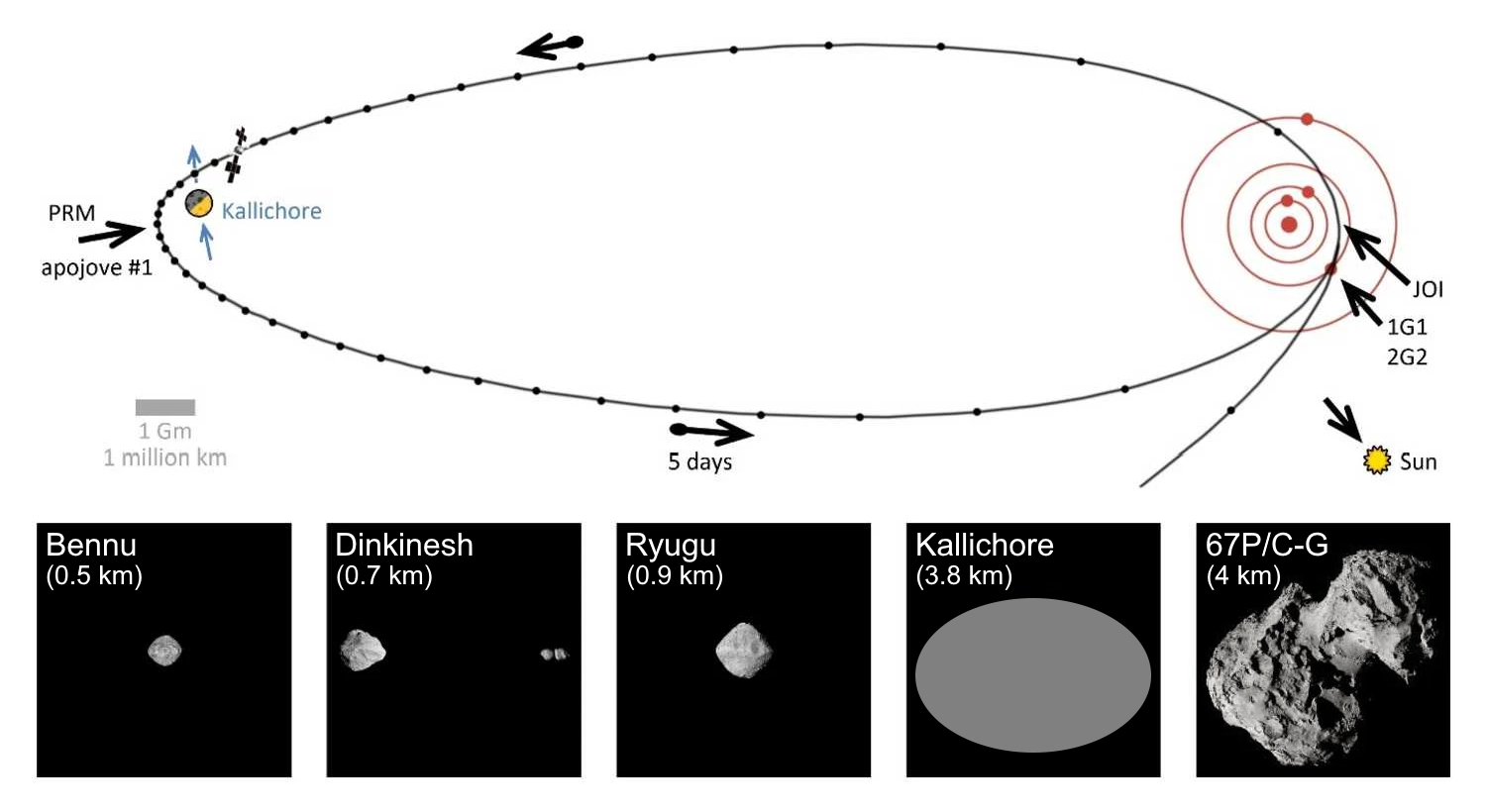
Possible Kallichore flyby

In July 2026, a team led by the Institute of Astrophysics of Andalusia published a detailed characterization of Jupiter's irregular moon Kallichore, providing data for a future decision whether to command Juice to perform a close flyby of the object in October 2031. The analysis included data from a stellar occultation by Kallichore on 15 December 2025.

=== Second Earth flyby ===
ESA Jupiter mission JUICE Earth flyby on 28 September 2026

On 28 September 2026, Juice performed a gravity assist maneuver by flying by Earth. The closest approach happened 8,640 km above the Indian Ocean at 11:45 UTC. The flyby deflected the spacecraft by 20° and increased its velocity by 3.5 km/s. During the flyby, Juice spent three hours in full and six in partial shadow, conditions closely resembling those expected around Jupiter. ESA used this opportunity to test the mission's power management.

All ten science instruments operated during the flyby. Mission scientists coordinated Juice's observations of Earth's magnetotail with those of SMILE, launched only four months before, closer to the planet. The JANUS camera system operated for five days, taking 740 images of Earth and the Moon using all 13 filters.

== Trajectory ==
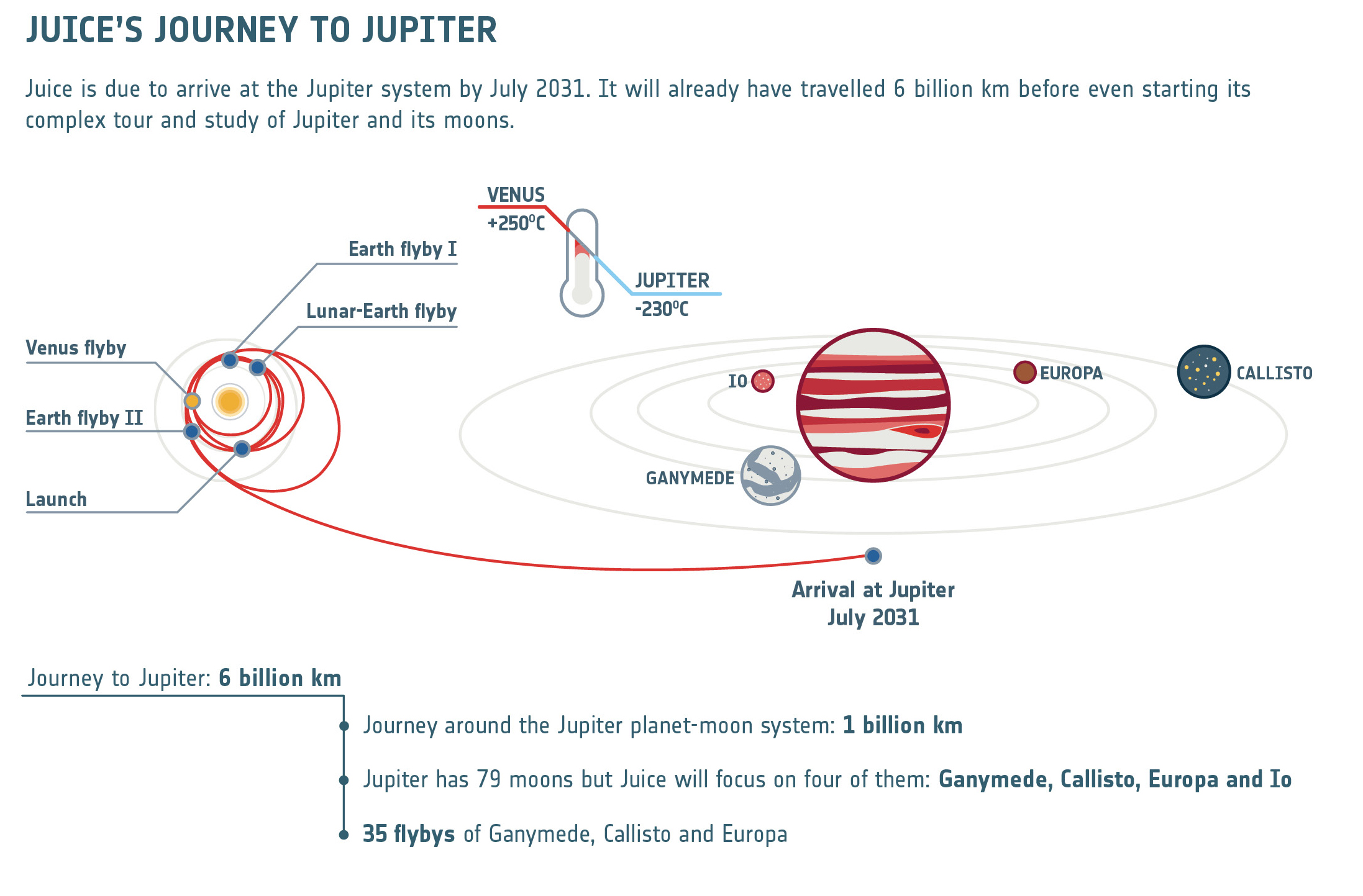
Juice's journey to Jupiter

Following the launch, multiple gravity assists are needed to put Juice on a trajectory to Jupiter:

- Flyby of the Earth–Moon system, completed in August 2024
- Flyby of Venus, completed in August 2025
- Second flyby of Earth, completed in September 2026
- Third and final flyby of Earth in January 2029

Juice will pass through the asteroid belt twice. A flyby of the asteroid (223) Rosa was proposed to occur in October 2029, but was removed from the mission plan to save fuel for the primary Jovian mission.

Gravity assists within the Jovian system include:

- Jupiter orbit insertion and apocentre reduction with multiple Ganymede gravity assists
- Reduction of velocity with Ganymede–Callisto assists
- Increase inclination with 10–12 Callisto gravity assists
Trajectories of Juice

Around the Sun

Around Jupiter

Around Ganymede

Sun · Earth · Juice · Venus · 223 Rosa · Jupiter · Ganymede · Callisto · Europa

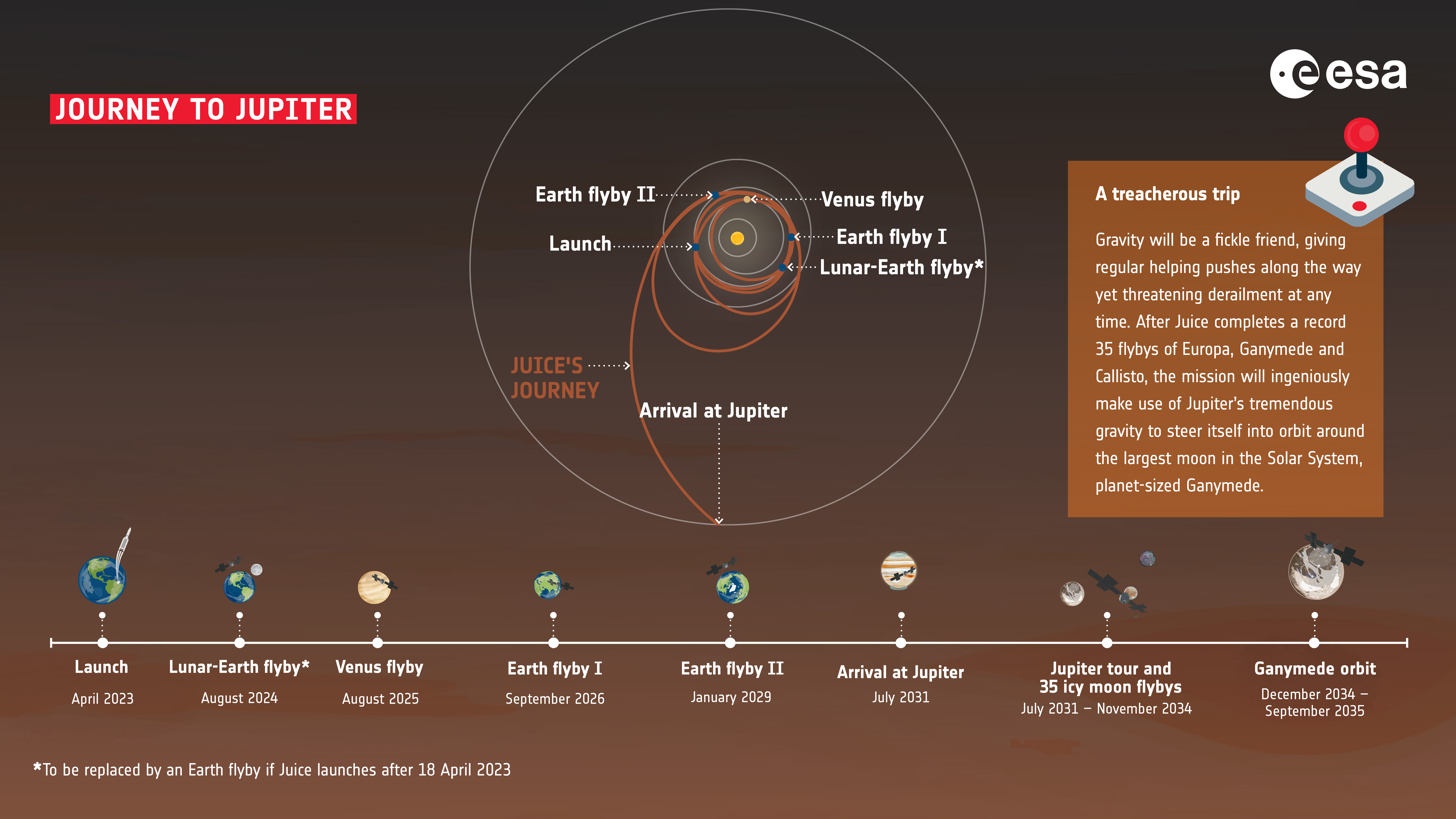
On its journey Juice will make a series of flybys of Earth, the Earth–Moon system and Venus to set it on course for its July 2031 rendezvous in the Jovian system

The main characteristics of the Jupiter reference tour are summarised below (source: Table 5-2 of ESA/SRE(2014)1). This scenario assumed an early June 2022 launch, however, the delta-V requirements are representative due to the rather short, repetitive orbital configurations of Europa, Ganymede and Callisto.

Event	Duration	Delta-V notes
Jupiter orbit insertion: When it arrives in the Jovian system in July 2031, Juice will first perform a 400 km (250 mi) Ganymede gravity assist flyby to reduce spacecraft velocity by ~300 m/s (670 mph), followed by ~900 m/s (2,000 mph) Jupiter orbit insertion engine burn ~7.5 hours later. Finally, a Perijove Raising Manoeuvre (PRM) burn at apoapsis will raise the periapsis of Juice's initial 13x243 Jovian radii elongated orbit to match that of Ganymede (15 Rj).	186 days	952 m/s (2,130 mph).
2nd Ganymede flyby to initial encounter with Callisto: 2nd, 3rd and 4th Ganymede flyby to reduce the orbital period and inclination of Juice's orbit, followed by 1st flyby of Callisto.	193 days	27 m/s (60 mph).
Europa phase: Starting in July 2032, there will be two <400 km (250 mi) flybys of Europa followed by another Callisto flyby. The brief Europa encounters (during which the probe is expected to sustain a third of its lifetime radiation exposure) are planned such that the radiation exposure is as low as possible, first by encountering Europa at perijove (i.e. the spacecraft's perijove is equal to Europa's orbital radius), and second by having only one low perijove passage per Europa flyby.	35 days	30 m/s (67 mph).
Inclined phase: ~6 further flybys of Callisto and Ganymede to temporarily increase the orbital inclination to 22 degrees. This will allow an investigation of Jupiter's polar regions and Jupiter's magnetosphere at the maximum inclination over a four-month period.	208 days	13 m/s (29 mph).
Transfer to Ganymede: A series of Callisto and Ganymede gravity assists will be performed to gradually reduce Juice's speed by 1,600 m/s (3,600 mph). Finally, a series of distant ~45,000 km (28,000 mi) flybys of the far side of Ganymede (near the Jupiter-Ganymede-L2 Lagrange point) will further reduce the required orbital insertion delta-V by 500 m/s (1,100 mph).	353 days	60 m/s (130 mph).
Ganymede orbital phase: In December 2034, Juice will enter an initial 12-hour polar orbit around Ganymede after performing a 185 m/s (410 mph) delta-V braking burn. Jupiter gravitational perturbations will gradually reduce the minimum orbital altitude to 500 km (310 mi) after ~100 days. The spacecraft will then perform two major engine firings to enter a nearly circular 500 km (310 mi) polar orbit, for a further six months of observations (e.g. Ganymede's composition and magnetosphere). The orbital phase includes a final stage at 200 km altitude. At the end of 2035, Jupiter perturbations will cause Juice to impact onto Ganymede within weeks as the spacecraft runs out of propellant.	284 days	614 m/s (1,370 mph).
Full tour (Jupiter orbit insertion to end of mission)	1259 days	1,696 m/s (3,790 mph).

== Science objectives ==
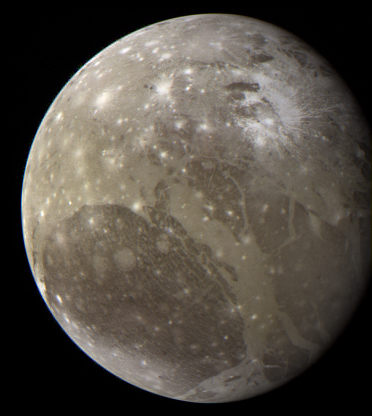
Ganymede view from Galileo

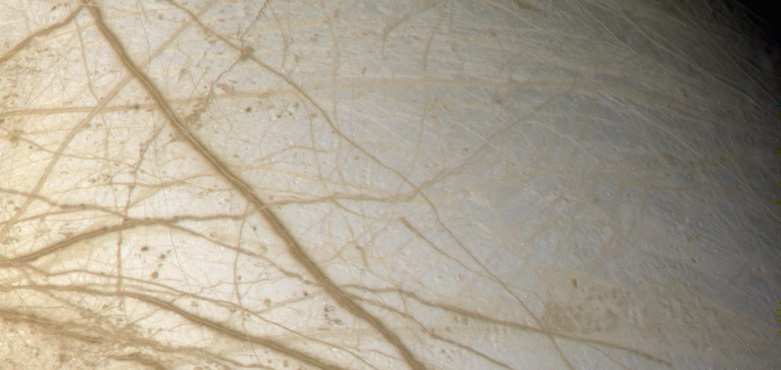
Section of Europa's icy surface, viewed from Galileo

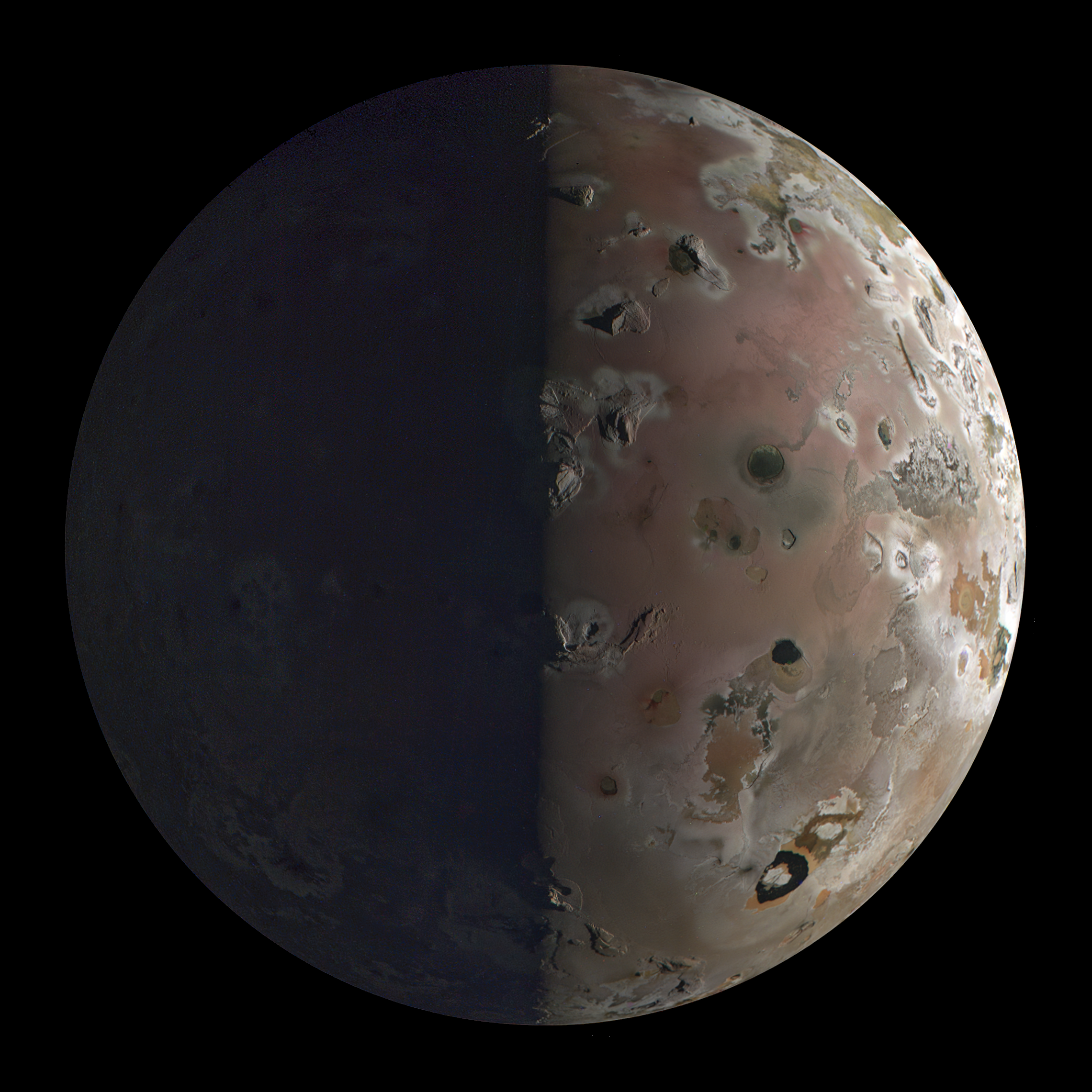
Io imaged by Juno

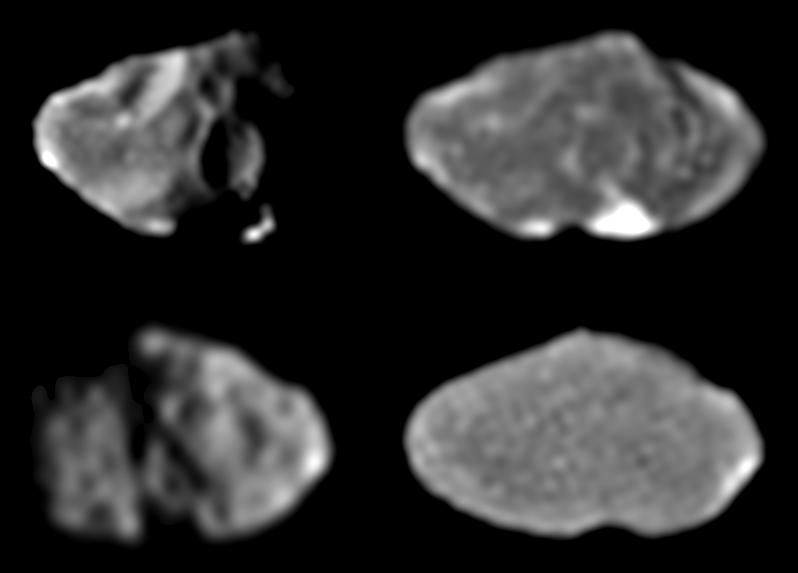
Galileo images showing Amalthea's irregular shape

Movie of Jupiter's atmosphere from Cassini

The Juice orbiter will perform detailed investigations on Ganymede and evaluate its potential to support life. Investigations of Europa and Callisto will complete a comparative picture of these Galilean moons. The three moons are thought to harbour internal liquid water oceans, and so are central to understanding the habitability of icy worlds.

=== Ganymede and Callisto ===
The main science objectives for Ganymede, and to a lesser extent for Callisto, are:

- Characterisation of the ocean layers and detection of putative subsurface water reservoirs
- Topographical, geological and compositional mapping of the surface
- Study of the physical properties of the icy crusts
- Characterisation of the internal mass distribution, dynamics and evolution of the interiors
- Investigation of Ganymede's tenuous atmosphere
- Study of Ganymede's intrinsic magnetic field and its interactions with the Jovian magnetosphere.

=== Europa ===
For Europa, the focus is on the chemistry essential to life, including organic molecules, and on understanding the formation of surface features and the composition of the non-water-ice material. The chemical investigations will be focused also on the question which chemicals originated underground and were brought to the surface by tectonics or cryovolcanism, and which arrived from above, originating at other places within the Jovian system.

Furthermore, Juice will provide the first subsurface sounding of the moon, including the first determination of the minimal thickness of the icy crust over the most recently volcanically active regions. Juice will be able to determine if pockets of liquid water exist within the ice and possibly also probe the interface between the icy shell and the subsurface ocean.

=== Io ===
Juice will monitor the volcanic activity of Io and study the composition of its surface materials from a distance of a few hundred thousand kilometers. The JANUS camera system will track surface changes at a scale of 6–12 kilometres (3.7–7.5 mi) per pixel, the UVS instrument will attempt to detect sulfur dioxide emissions and auroras, and the PEP instrument will monitor Io's plasma torus.

=== Other moons and Jupiter's rings ===
Juice will carry out distant observations of several inner and outer (irregular) satellites of Jupiter throughout its mission. These distant observations of irregular moons involve measuring changes in their brightness over long periods of time, which will enable the determination of their shapes and synodic rotation periods.

During its first orbit around Jupiter, Juice will pass within 600,000 km (370,000 mi) of Jupiter's irregular moon Kallichore in October 2031. The trajectory of Juice could potentially be adjusted to fly even closer to Kallichore for high-resolution imaging of its surface, but this possibility remains under investigation by the Juice mission team as of 2026.

The mission will also observe Jupiter's dusty rings and study their interactions with the small inner moons: Metis, Adrastea, Amalthea, and Thebe. Juice is expected to provide the first detailed spectrographic images of these moons orbiting inside Io's orbit and contribute to solving the so called "Amalthea's Paradox" referring to the moon's surprisingly low density.

=== Jupiter's atmosphere and magnetosphere ===
Juice will repeatedly map Jupiter's atmosphere and use its instruments to explore the poorly understood middle and upper atmosphere, focusing on the processes connecting the various layers and measuring, for the first time, the winds in Jupiter's middle atmosphere. These observations are expected to deepen our understanding of the transport of energy between various regions of the atmosphere and the processes behind the longevity of the Great Red Spot and other weather systems. Juice will also conduct detailed studies of Jupiter’s magnetosphere and focus on its interactions with the Galilean moons, especially the processes transporting plasma from Io to the icy moons.

== Science instruments ==
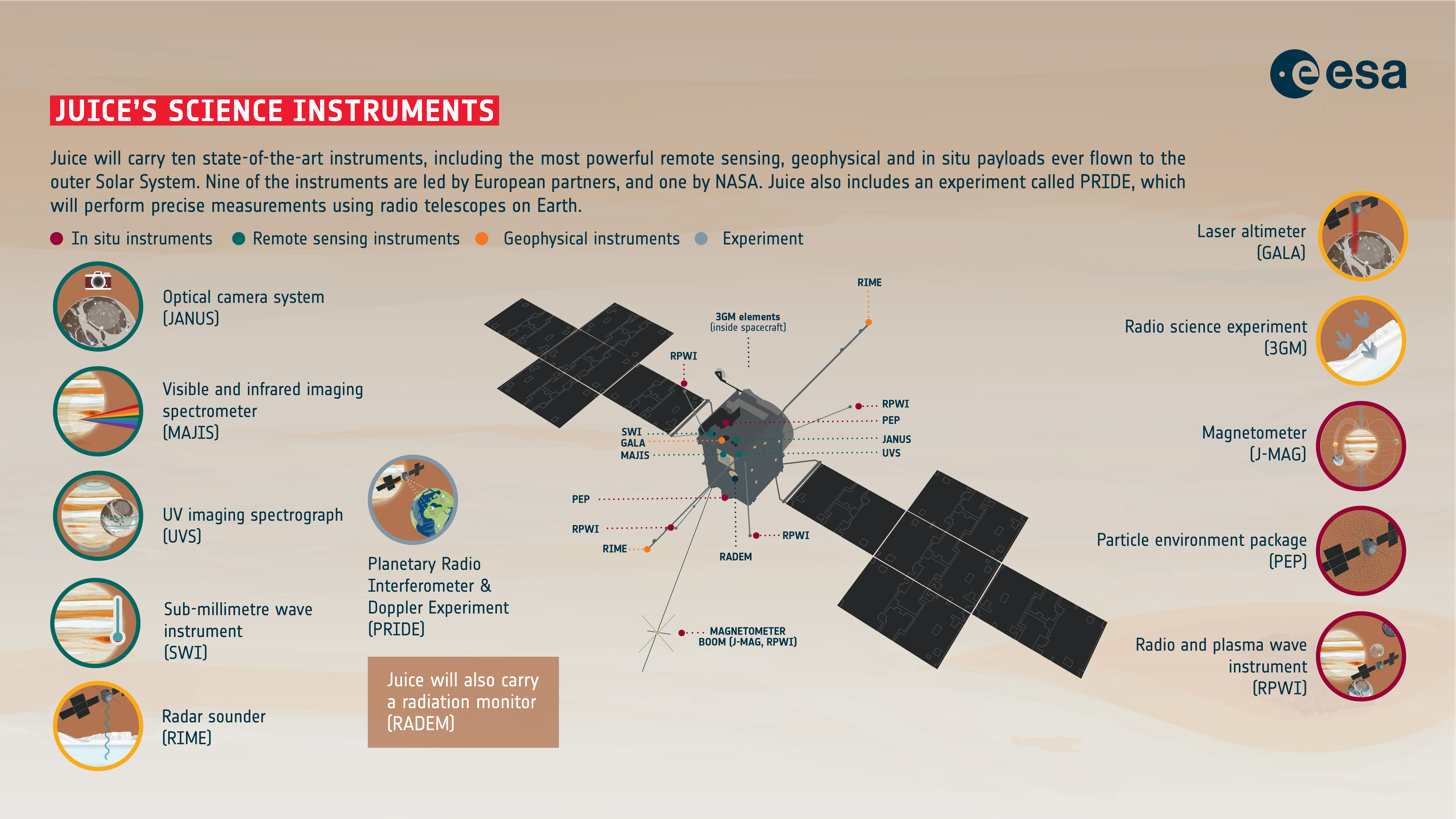
Juice's instruments

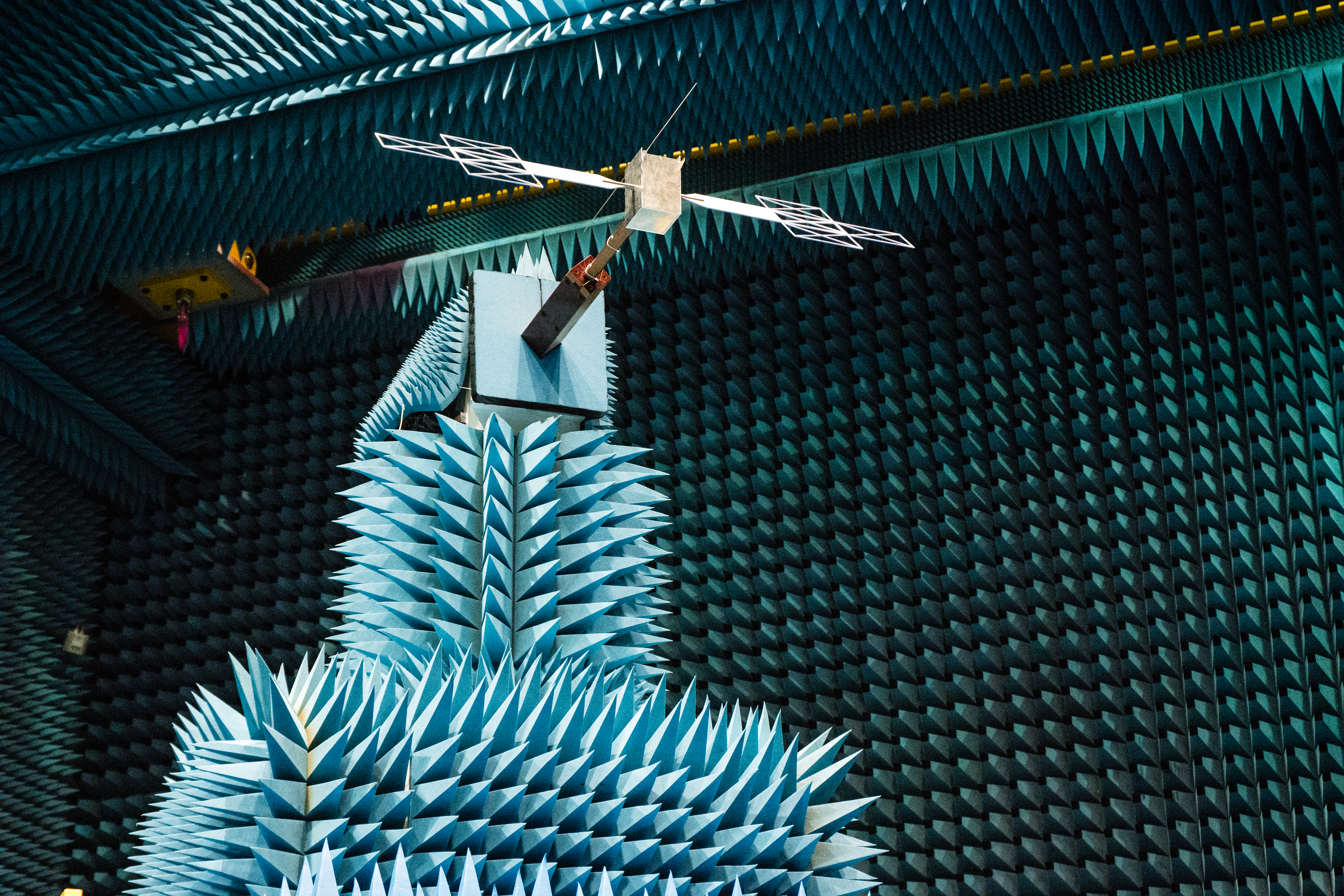
Testing a scale model of Juice's RIME antenna in the Hertz facility, 2023

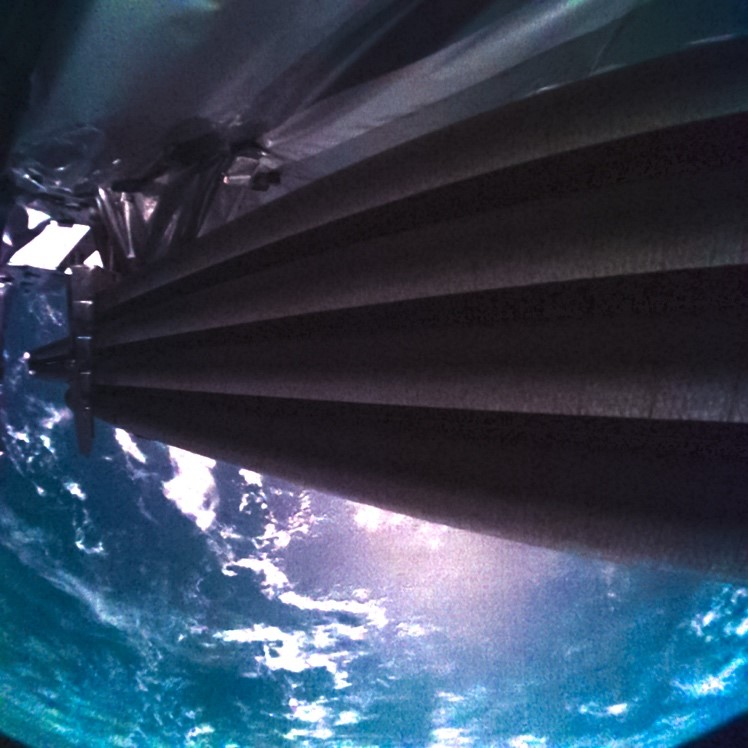
The RIME antenna in stowed configuration. A "selfie" photograph, shortly after launch by JMC2, with Earth in the background

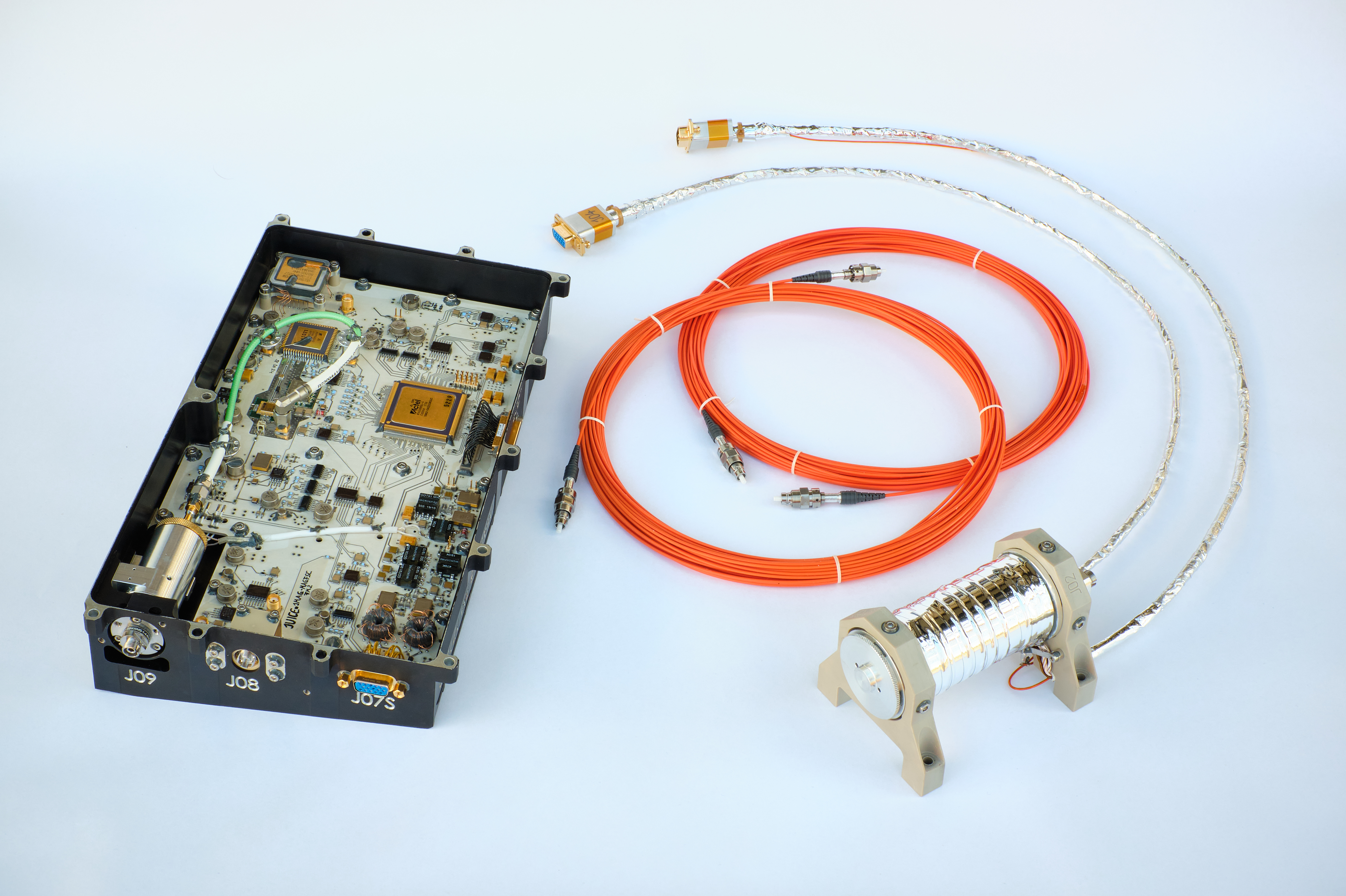
The scalar sub-instrument (MAGSCA), an optical magnetometer with low absolute error, is part of J-MAG

On 21 February 2013, after a competition, 10 science instruments (plus one experiment using the spacecraft's telecommunication system) were selected by ESA, which were developed by science and engineering teams from all over Europe, with participation from the US. Japan also contributed several components for SWI, RPWI, GALA, PEP, JANUS, and J-MAG instruments, and will facilitate testing.

=== Jovis, Amorum ac Natorum Undique Scrutator (JANUS) ===
The name is Latin for "comprehensive observation of Jupiter, his love affairs and descendants." It is a camera system to image Ganymede and interesting parts of the surface of Callisto at better than 400 m/pixel (resolution limited by mission data volume). Selected targets will be investigated in high-resolution with a spatial resolution from 25 m/pixel down to 2.4 m/pixel with a 1.3° field of view. The camera system has 13 panchromatic, broad and narrow-band filters in the 0.36 μm to 1.1 μm range, and provides stereo imaging capabilities. JANUS will also allow relating spectral, laser, and radar measurements to geomorphology and thus will provide the overall geological context.

=== Moons and Jupiter Imaging Spectrometer (MAJIS) ===
A visible and infrared imaging spectrograph operating from 0.5 μm to 5.56 μm, with spectral resolution of 3–7 nm, that will observe tropospheric cloud features and minor gas species on Jupiter and will investigate the composition of ices and minerals on the surfaces of the icy moons. The spatial resolution will be down to 75 m (246 ft) on Ganymede and about 100 km (62 mi) on Jupiter.

=== UV Imaging Spectrograph (UVS) ===
An imaging spectrograph operating in the wavelength range 55–210 nm with spectral resolution of <0.6 nm that will characterise exospheres and aurorae of the icy moons, including plume searches on Europa, and study the Jovian upper atmosphere and aurorae. Resolution up to 500 m (1,600 ft) observing Ganymede and up to 250 km (160 mi) observing Jupiter.

=== Sub-millimeter Wave Instrument (SWI) ===
A spectrometer using a 30 cm (12 in) antenna and working in 1080–1275 GHz and 530–601 GHz with spectral resolving power of ~10^{7} that will study Jupiter's stratosphere and troposphere, and the exospheres and surfaces of the icy moons.

=== Ganymede Laser Altimeter (GALA) ===
A laser altimeter with a 20 m (66 ft) spot size and 10 cm (3.9 in) vertical resolution at 200 km (120 mi) intended for studying topography of icy moons and tidal deformations of Ganymede.

=== Radar for Icy Moons Exploration (RIME) ===
An ice-penetrating radar working at frequency of 9 MHz (1 and 3 MHz bandwidth) emitted by a 16 m (52 ft) antenna; will be used to study the subsurface structure of Jovian moons down to 9 km (5.6 mi) depth with vertical resolution up to 30 m (98 ft) in ice.

=== Juice-Magnetometer (J-MAG) ===
Juice will study the subsurface oceans of the icy moons and the interaction of Jovian magnetic field with the magnetic field of Ganymede using a sensitive magnetometer. It is mounted on 10.6 meter long boom, and the sensors and housings are fully covered in thermal blankets. The magnetometer boom is the longest magnetometer boom ever build for a ESA spacecraft and mission.

=== Particle Environment Package (PEP) ===
A suite of six sensors to study the magnetosphere of Jupiter and its interactions with the Jovian moons. PEP will measure positive and negative ions, electrons, exospheric neutral gas, thermal plasma and energetic neutral atoms present in all domains of the Jupiter system from 1 meV to 1 MeV energy.

=== Radio and Plasma Wave Investigation (RPWI) ===
RPWI will characterise the plasma environment and radio emissions around the spacecraft, it is composed of four experiments: GANDALF, MIME, FRODO, and JENRAGE. RPWI will use four Langmuir probes, each one mounted at the end of its own dedicated boom and sensitive up to 1.6 MHz, to characterize plasma, and receivers in the frequency range 80 kHz to 45 MHz to measure radio emissions. This scientific instrument is somewhat notable for using Sonic the Hedgehog as part of its logo.

=== Gravity and Geophysics of Jupiter and Galilean Moons (3GM) ===
3GM is a radio science package comprising a Ka transponder and an ultrastable oscillator. 3GM will be used to study the gravity field at Ganymede (up to 10 degrees), to determine the extent of internal oceans on the icy moons, and to investigate the structure of the neutral atmospheres and ionospheres of Jupiter (0.1 – 800 mbar) and its moons. 3GM carries an Israeli-built atomic clock "that will measure tiny vacillations in a radio beam".

=== Planetary Radio Interferometer and Doppler Experiment (PRIDE) ===
The experiment will generate specific signals transmitted by Juice's antenna and received by very-long-baseline interferometry to perform precision measurements of the gravity fields of Jupiter and its icy moons.

== See also ==
- Exploration of Jupiter
  - Galileo – former Jupiter orbiter
  - Juno – current Jupiter orbiter
  - Europa Clipper – NASA space mission to Jupiter and Europa
  - Tianwen-4 – planned Jupiter/Callisto orbiter
  - Jupiter flybys: Pioneer 10 & 11; Voyager 1 & 2; Ulysses; Cassini–Huygens; New Horizons
- 17776, a speculative fiction work featuring a sentient Juice
- List of European Space Agency programmes and missions
