= Nrad =

nrad may mean:

- abbreviation of nanoradian (nrad), a unit of angle
- abbreviation of nanorad (nrad), a unit of radiation dose
