= Ariane flight VA260 =

Launch of Jupiter Icy Moons Explorer

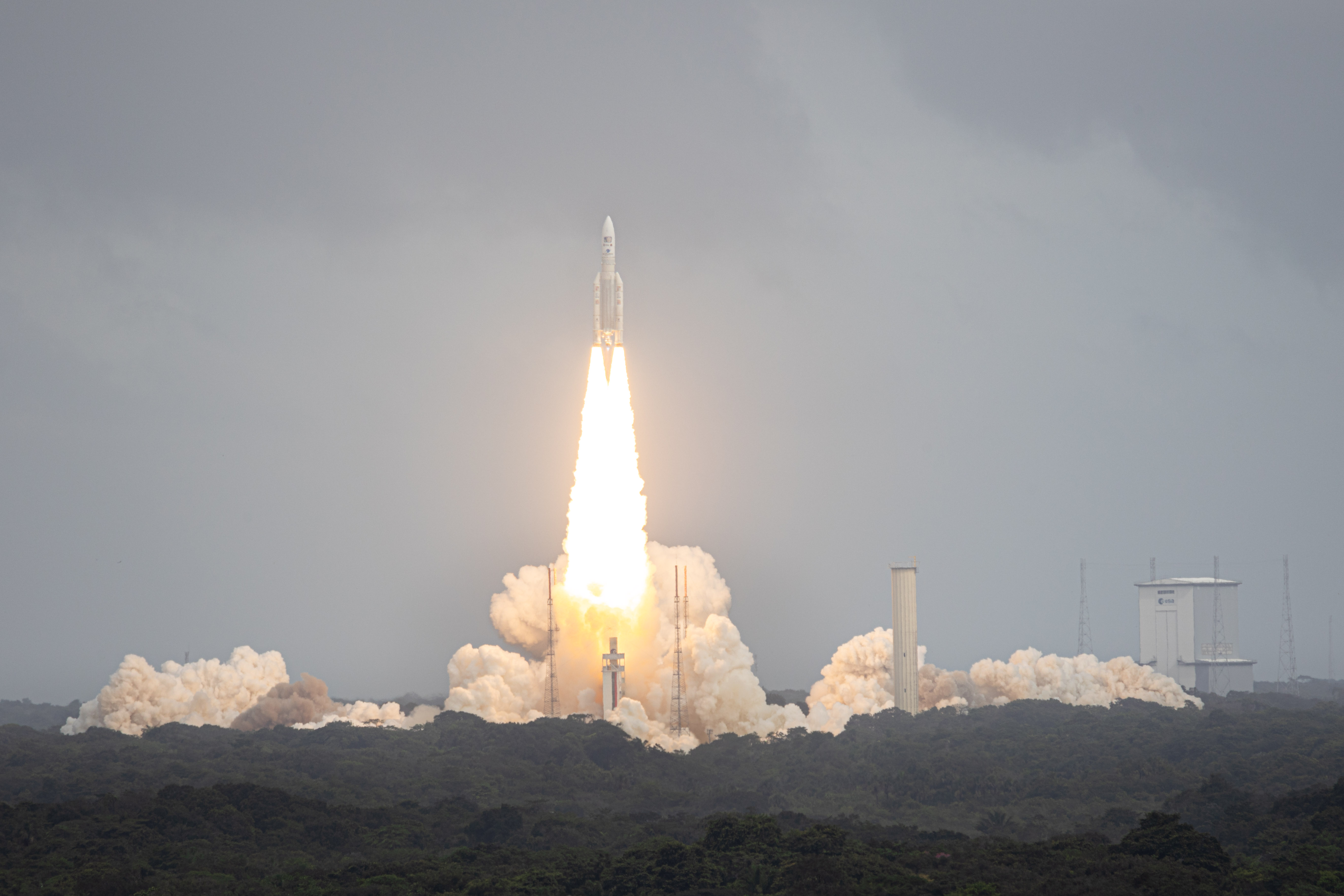
- Launch of Ariane 5 carrying Juice to Jupiter

Ariane 5 ECA+ launch
- Launch: 14 April 2023, 12:14 UTC
- Operator: Arianespace
- Pad: Guiana Space Centre, ELA-3
- Payload: Juice
- Outcome: Success

Components
- Serial no.: 5120

Ariane launches

Ariane flight VA260 was an Ariane 5 rocket flight that launched the Jupiter Icy Moons Explorer (Juice) into space on 14 April 2023. It was 2023's first Ariane flight, and the 116th and penultimate Ariane 5 mission.

== Launch configuration ==
=== Rocket ===
Ariane 5 is a heavy lift two-stage rocket with two solid fuel boosters. It was used in its ECA+ variant, which offers the highest payload mass capacity. The total launch mass of the vehicle is 770,000 kg (1,700,000 lb).

=== Payload ===
The only payload on the flight was the Jupiter Icy Moons Explorer, an orbiter going to planet Jupiter built by Airbus Defence and Space for ESA. Juice is the first European mission to Jupiter.

== Launch ==
Launch preparation began after the arrival of Juice in Kourou, French Guiana. After fuelling and other works, the Juice spacecraft was Integrated with Ariane 5. After completing all preparations, the rocket was rolled out to the launch pad a day before launch.

| Attempt | Planned | Result | Turnaround | Reason | Decision point | Weather go (%) | Notes |
|---|---|---|---|---|---|---|---|
| 1 | 13 Apr 2023, 9:15:00 am | Scrubbed | — | Weather | 13 Apr 2023, 9:05 am (T−00:10:00) | | Risk of lightning in launch area. |
| 2 | 14 Apr 2023, 9:14:36 am | Success | 0 days 23 hours 60 minutes | | | | |

The rocket was launched from the ELA-3 launch pad of the Guiana Space Centre on 14 April 2023 at 12:14 UTC. Juice was injected into an Interplanetary trajectory that took it to multiple flybys until reaching its destination planet Jupiter.

== Gallery ==
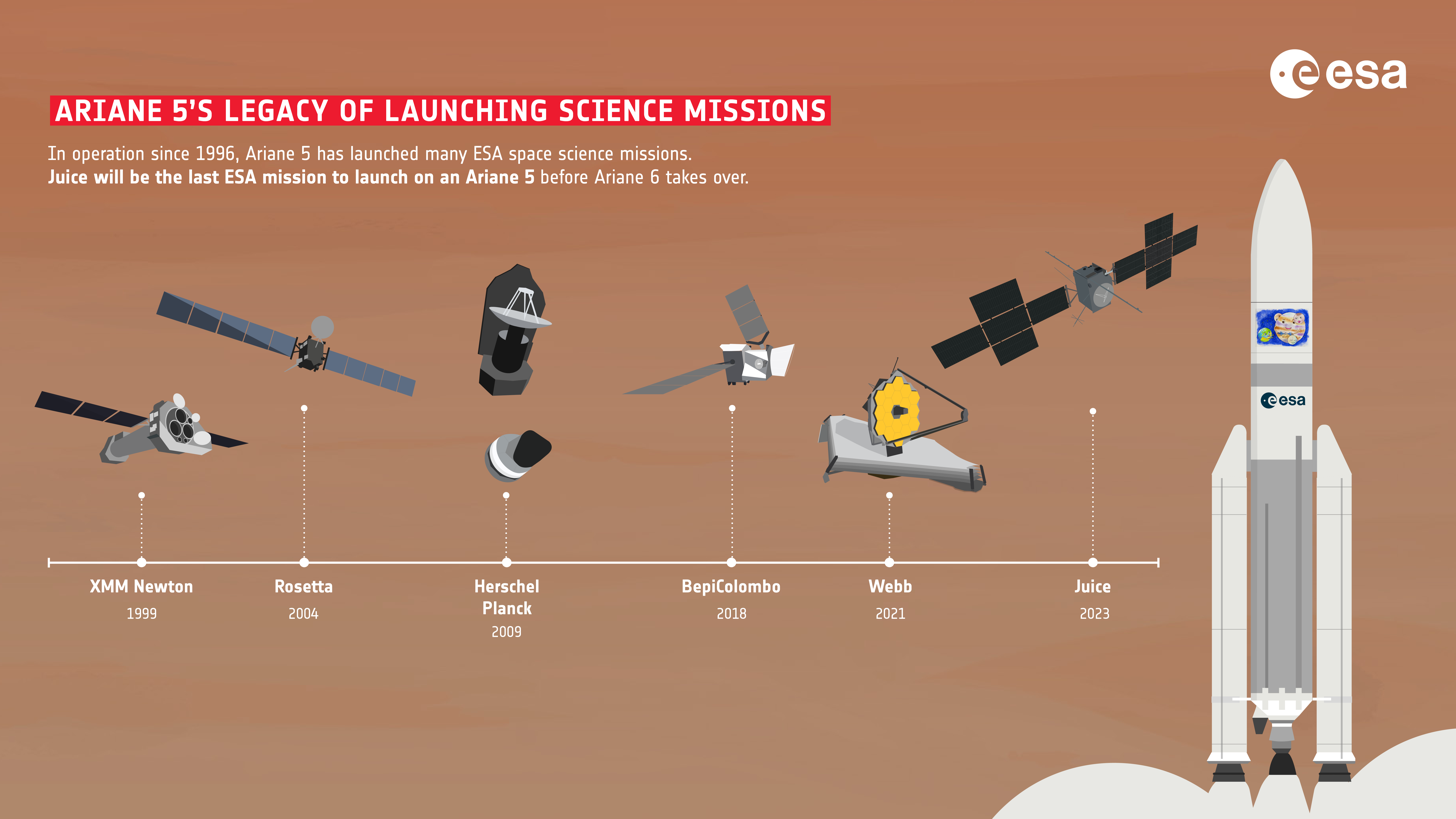
Important missions launched by Ariane 5

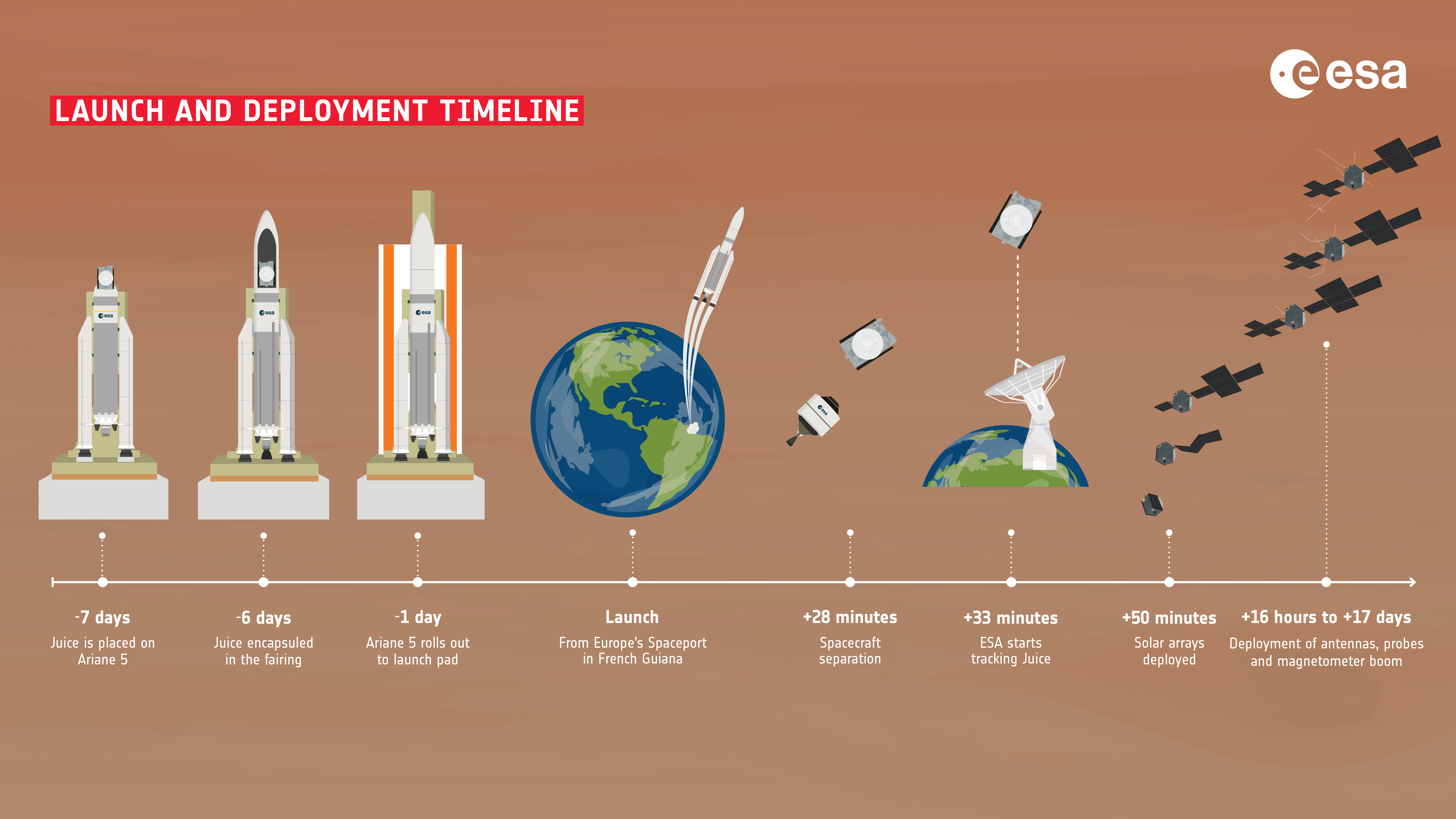
Deployment timeline of the Juice mission before and after launch

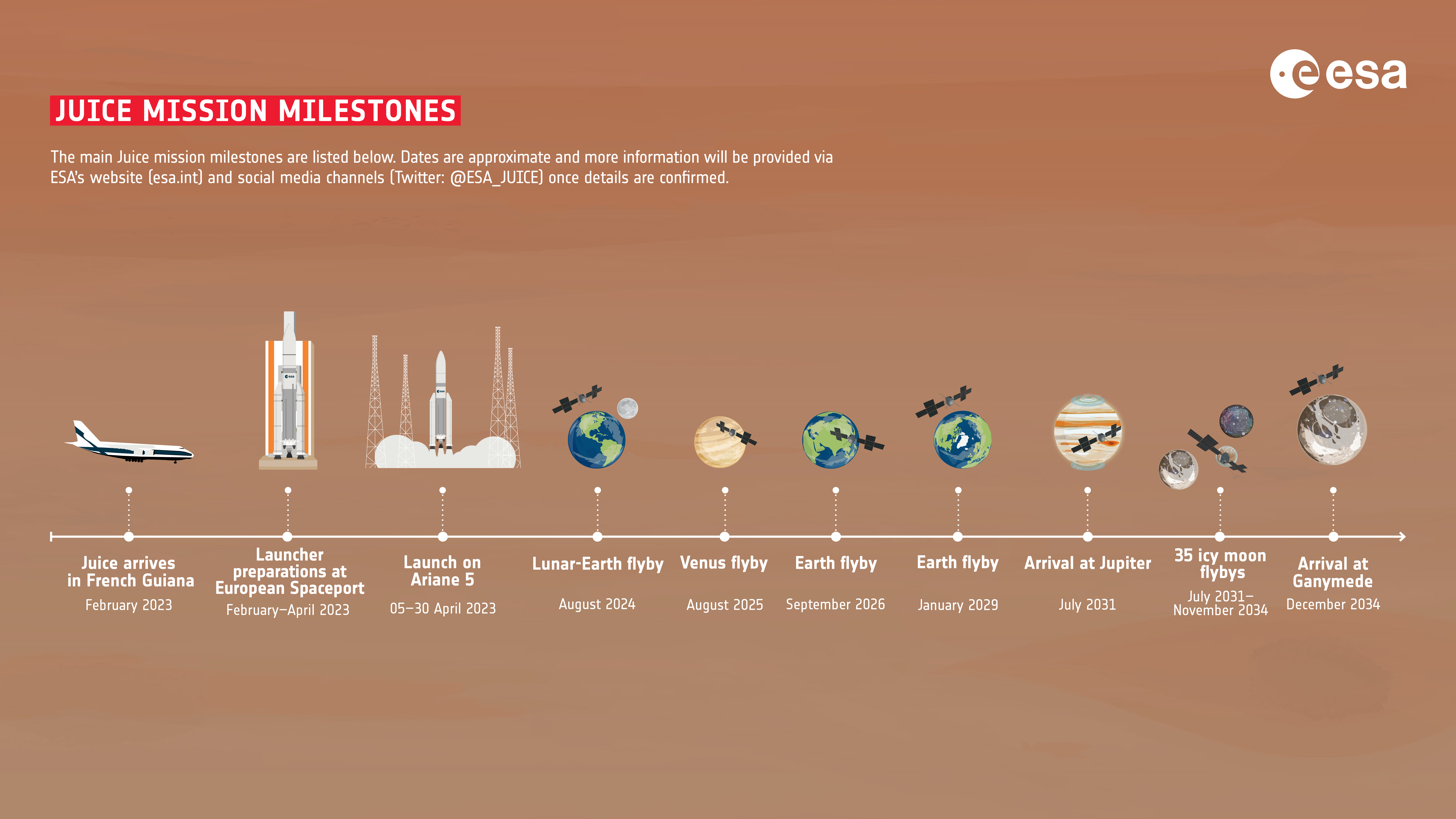
Milestones of the Juice mission before reaching Jupiter

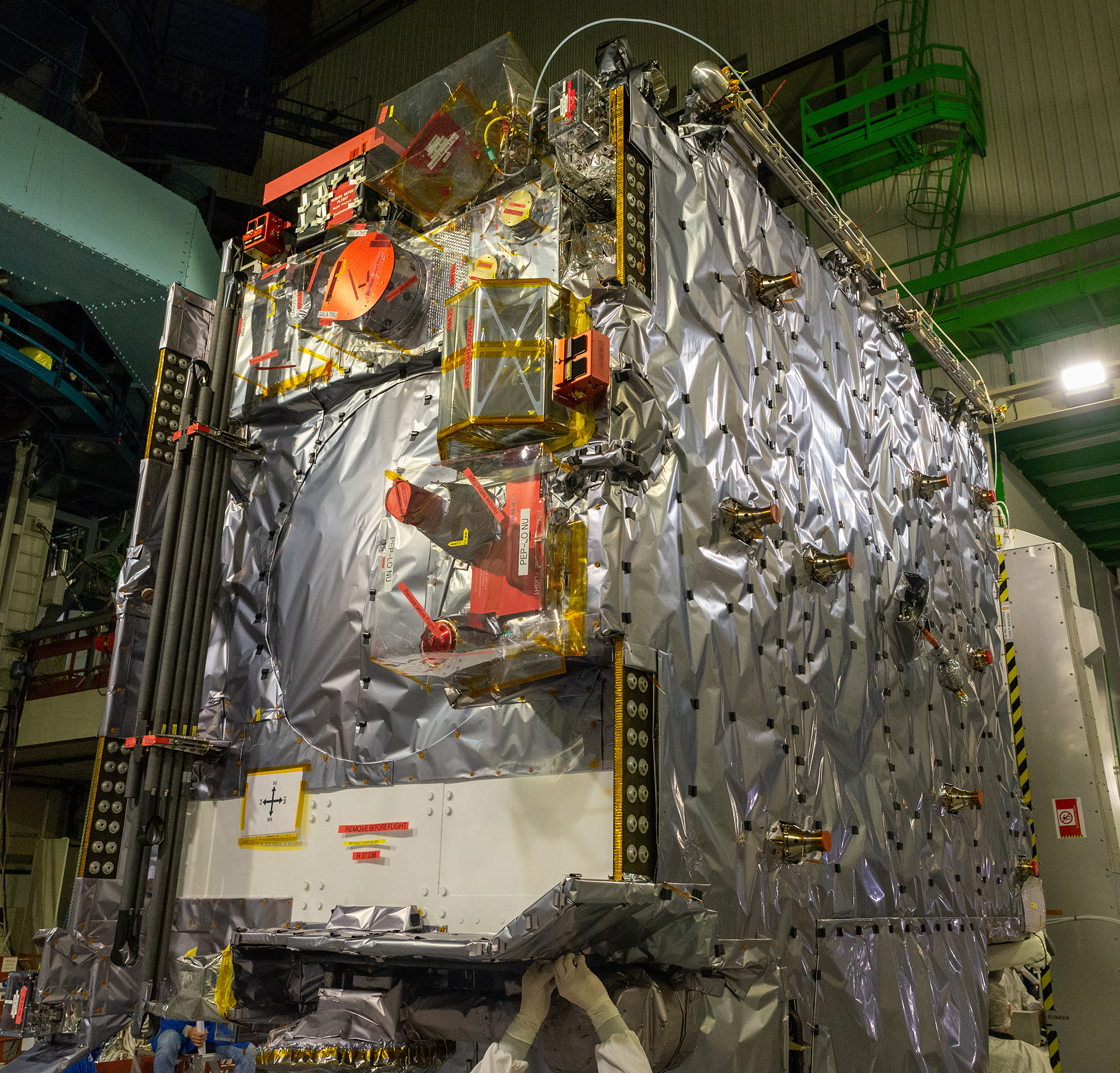
Juice spacecraft during integration

== See also ==
- List of Ariane launches
