= F-factor (conversion factor) =

Number relating the exposure and absorbed dose of ionizing radiation

Summary of some radiation-related units

In diagnostic radiology, the F-factor is the conversion factor between exposure to ionizing radiation and the absorbed dose from that radiation. In other words, it converts between the amount of ionization in air (roentgens or, in SI units, coulombs per kilogram of absorber material) and the absorbed dose in air (rads or grays). The two determinants of the F-factor are the effective atomic number (Z) of the material and the type of ionizing radiation being considered. Since the effective Z of air and soft tissue is approximately the same, the F-factor is approximately 1 for many x-ray imaging applications. However, bone has an F-factor of up to 4, due to its higher effective Z.

== Radiation-related quantities ==
The following table shows radiation quantities in SI and non-SI units.

Ionizing radiation related quantities
Quantity	Unit	Symbol	Derivation	Year	SI equivalent
Activity (A)	becquerel	Bq	s^{−1}	1974	SI unit
Activity (A)	curie	Ci	3.7×10^{10} s^{−1}	1953	3.7×10^{10} Bq
Activity (A)	rutherford	Rd	10^{6} s^{−1}	1946	1000000 Bq
Exposure (X)	coulomb per kilogram	C/kg	C⋅kg^{−1} of air	1974	SI unit
Exposure (X)	röntgen	R	esu / 0.001293 g of air	1928	2.58×10^{−4} C/kg
Absorbed dose (D)	gray	Gy	J⋅kg^{−1}	1974	SI unit
Absorbed dose (D)	erg per gram	erg/g	erg⋅g^{−1}	1950	1.0×10^{−4} Gy
Absorbed dose (D)	rad	rad	100 erg⋅g^{−1}	1953	0.010 Gy
Equivalent dose (H)	sievert	Sv	J⋅kg^{−1} × W_{R}	1977	SI unit
Equivalent dose (H)	röntgen equivalent man	rem	100 erg⋅g^{−1} × W_{R}	1971	0.010 Sv
Effective dose (E)	sievert	Sv	J⋅kg^{−1} × W_{R} × W_{T}	1977	SI unit
Effective dose (E)	röntgen equivalent man	rem	100 erg⋅g^{−1} × W_{R} × W_{T}	1971	0.010 Sv

== See also ==
- Gray (unit)
- Sievert
- Equivalent dose
- Relative biological effectiveness
