= 223 Rosa =

Themistian asteroid

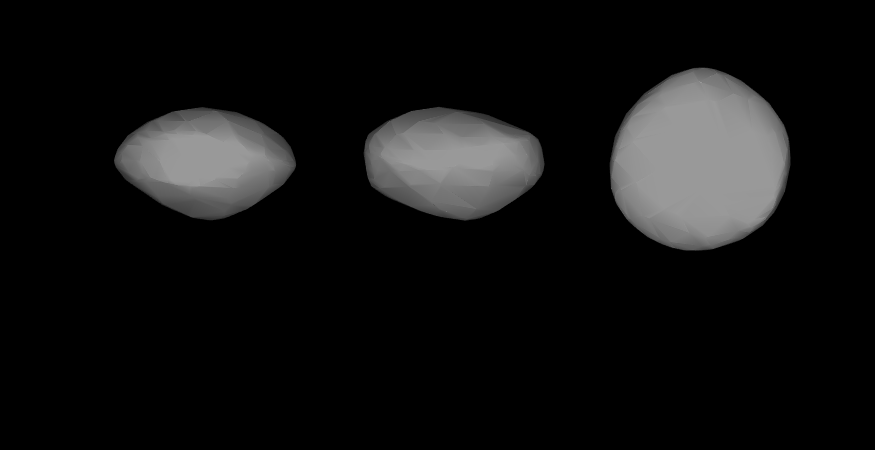
- Lightcurve-based 3D model of 223 Rosa

Discovery
- Discovered by: Johann Palisa
- Discovery date: 9 March 1882

Designations
- Alternative designations: A882 EA, 1887 BA; 1942 EL
- Minor planet category: Main belt (Themis)

Orbital characteristics
- Epoch 31 July 2016 (JD 2457600.5)
- Uncertainty parameter 0
- Observation arc: 130.29 yr (47590 d)
- Aphelion: 3.45415 AU (516.733 Gm)
- Perihelion: 2.73689 AU (409.433 Gm)
- Semi-major axis: 3.09552 AU (463.083 Gm)
- Eccentricity: 0.11586
- Orbital period (sidereal): 5.45 yr (1989.3 d)
- Average orbital speed: 16.94 km/s
- Mean anomaly: 309.511°
- Mean motion: 0° 10^{m} 51.488^{s} / day
- Inclination: 1.93552°
- Longitude of ascending node: 47.9276°
- Argument of perihelion: 61.7716°

Proper orbital elements
- Proper semi-major axis: 3.0901 AU
- Proper eccentricity: 0.1347
- Proper inclination: 1.52° (Note: Calculated from $\sin\left(i\right)=0.0266$.)

Physical characteristics
- Mean diameter: 69+9 −3 km (pole solution 1); 70+6 −2 km (pole solution 2)
- Mass: (1.35±0.60)×10^{17} kg (Note: Calculated from its standard gravitational parameter GM = 0.009±0.004 km^{3}/s^{2}.) (9.48±6.98)×10^{16} kg (3.62±1.25)×10^{17} kg
- Mean density: 0.53–2.10 g/cm^{3} (calculated)
- Synodic rotation period: 20.2772±0.0003 h (pole solution 1); 20.2769±0.0003 h (pole solution 2)
- Pole ecliptic longitude: 22° ± 3° or 203° ± 2°
- Pole ecliptic latitude: 18° ± 18° or 26° ± 15°
- Geometric albedo: 0.033 ± 0.006 (composite estimate); 0.033+0.006 −0.004 (pole solution 1); 0.032+0.007 −0.003 (pole solution 2)
- Spectral type: X/P (Tholen); Xc (Bus); T (Bus-DeMeo)
- Absolute magnitude (H): 9.68, 9.72

223 Rosa is a large Themistian asteroid. It is classified as a combination of C-type and P-type asteroids, so it is probably composed of carbonaceous material rich in water ice. It was discovered by Johann Palisa on 9 March 1882, in Vienna. The origin of the name is not known.

Photometric observations made in 2011–2012 at the Organ Mesa Observatory in Las Cruces, New Mexico, produced a light curve with a period of 20.283 ± 0.002 hours and a brightness variation of 0.13 ± 0.02 in magnitude. The curve has two asymmetrical maxima and minima per 20.283-hour cycle.

A flyby of Rosa by the Juice spacecraft, which is planned to pass through the asteroid belt twice, was proposed to occur on 15 October 2029. However, the mission team ultimately decided against the proposed flyby to maximize fuel for the primary mission.
