= Rad (radiation unit) =

Non-SI unit measuring absorbed dose of ionizing radiation

rad
- Unit system: CGS units
- Unit of: Absorbed dose of ionizing radiation
- Symbol: rad

Conversions
1 rad in ...	... is equal to ...
- SI derived units: 0.01 J⋅kg^{−1}
- SI units: 0.01 Gy
- CGS: 100 erg/g

Relation between some ionizing radiation units

The rad is a unit of absorbed radiation dose, defined as 1 rad = 0.01 Gy = 0.01 J/kg. It was originally defined in CGS units in 1953 as the dose causing 100 ergs of energy to be absorbed by one gram of matter. The material absorbing the radiation can be human tissue, air, water, or any other substance.

It has been replaced by the gray (symbol Gy) in SI derived units. The rad is still used in the United States, although this is "strongly discouraged" in Chapter 5.2 of the Guide to the SI, which was written and published by the U.S. National Institute of Standards and Technology. However, the numerically equivalent SI unit submultiple, the centigray (symbol cGy), is widely used to report absorbed doses within radiotherapy. The roentgen, used to quantify the radiation exposure, may be related to the corresponding absorbed dose by use of the F-factor.

== Health effects ==
A dose of under 100 rad will typically produce no immediate symptoms other than blood changes. A dose of 100 to 200 rad delivered to the entire body in less than a day may cause acute radiation syndrome (ARS), but is usually not fatal. Doses of 200 to 1,000 rad delivered in a few hours will cause serious illness, with poor prognosis at the upper end of the range. Whole body doses of more than 1,000 rad are almost invariably fatal. Therapeutic doses of radiation therapy are often given and tolerated well even at higher doses to treat discrete, well-defined anatomical structures. The same dose given over a longer period of time is less likely to cause ARS. Dose thresholds are about 50% higher for dose rates of 20 rad/h, and even higher for lower dose rates.

The International Commission on Radiological Protection maintains a model of health risks as a function of absorbed dose and other factors. That model calculates an effective radiation dose, measured in units of rem, which is more representative of the stochastic risk than the absorbed dose in rad. In most power plant scenarios, where the radiation environment is dominated by X- or gamma rays applied uniformly to the whole body, 1 rad of absorbed dose gives 1 rem of effective dose. In other situations, the effective dose in rem might be thirty times higher or thousands of times lower than the absorbed dose in rad.

Dose examples (metric prefixed unit multiples)
25 rad:	Lowest dose to cause clinically observable blood changes
200 rad:	Local dose for onset of erythema in humans
400 rad:	Whole body LD_{50} for acute radiation syndrome in humans
1 krad:	Whole body LD_{100} for acute radiation syndrome in humans
1–20 krad:	Typical radiation tolerance of ordinary microchips
4–8 krad:	Typical radiotherapy dose, locally applied
10 krad:	Fatal whole-body dose in 1964 Wood River Junction criticality accident
1 Mrad:	Typical tolerance of radiation-hardened microchips

SI multiples of rad (rad)
Submultiples			Multiples		
Value	SI symbol	Name	Value	SI symbol	Name
10^{−1} rad	drad	decirad	10^{1} rad	darad	decarad
10^{−2} rad	crad	centirad	10^{2} rad	hrad	hectorad
10^{−3} rad	mrad	millirad	10^{3} rad	krad	kilorad
10^{−6} rad	μrad	microrad	10^{6} rad	Mrad	megarad
10^{−9} rad	nrad	nanorad	10^{9} rad	Grad	gigarad
10^{−12} rad	prad	picorad	10^{12} rad	Trad	terarad
10^{−15} rad	frad	femtorad	10^{15} rad	Prad	petarad
10^{−18} rad	arad	attorad	10^{18} rad	Erad	exarad
10^{−21} rad	zrad	zeptorad	10^{21} rad	Zrad	zettarad
10^{−24} rad	yrad	yoctorad	10^{24} rad	Yrad	yottarad
10^{−27} rad	rrad	rontorad	10^{27} rad	Rrad	ronnarad
10^{−30} rad	qrad	quectorad	10^{30} rad	Qrad	quettarad

== History ==
In the 1930s the roentgen was the most commonly used unit of radiation exposure. This unit is obsolete and no longer clearly defined. One roentgen deposits 0.877 rad in dry air, 0.96 rad in soft tissue, or anywhere from 1 to more than 4 rad in bone depending on the beam energy. These conversions to absorbed energy all depend on the ionizing energy of a standard medium, which is ambiguous in the latest NIST definition. Even where the standard medium is fully defined, the ionizing energy is often not precisely known.

In 1940, British physicist Louis Harold Gray, who had been studying the effect of neutron damage on human tissue, together with William Valentine Mayneord and John Read published a paper in which a unit of measure, dubbed the "gram roentgen" (symbol: gr) defined as "that amount of neutron radiation which produces an increment in energy in unit volume of tissue equal to the increment of energy produced in unit volume of water by one roentgen of radiation" was proposed. This unit was found to be equivalent to 88 ergs in air. It marked a shift towards measurements based on energy rather than charge.

The Röntgen equivalent physical (rep), introduced by Herbert Parker in 1945, was the absorbed energetic dose to tissue before factoring in relative biological effectiveness. The rep has variously been defined as 83 or 93 ergs per gram of tissue (8.3/9.3 mGy) or per cc of tissue.

In 1953 the ICRU recommended the rad, equal to 100 erg/g as a new unit of absorbed radiation, but then promoted a switch to the gray in the 1970s.

The International Committee for Weights and Measures (CIPM) has not accepted the use of the rad. From 1977 to 1998, the US NIST's translations of the SI brochure stated that the CIPM had temporarily accepted the use of the rad (and other radiology units) with SI units since 1969. However, the only related CIPM decisions shown in the appendix are with regards to the curie in 1964 and the radian (symbol: rad) in 1960. The NIST brochures redefined the rad as 0.01 Gy. The US NIST clarified in 1998 that it was providing its own interpretations of the SI system, whereby it accepted the rad for use in the US with the SI, while recognizing that the CIPM did not. NIST recommends defining the rad in relation to SI units in every document where this unit is used. Nevertheless, use of the rad remains widespread in the US, where it is still an industry standard. Although the United States Nuclear Regulatory Commission still permits the use of the units curie, rad, and rem alongside SI units, the European Union required that its use for "public health ... purposes" be phased out by 31 December 1985.

== Radiation-related quantities ==
The following table shows radiation quantities in SI and non-SI units:

Ionizing radiation related quantities
Quantity	Unit	Symbol	Derivation	Year	SI equivalent
Activity (A)	becquerel	Bq	s^{−1}	1974	SI unit
Activity (A)	curie	Ci	3.7×10^{10} s^{−1}	1953	3.7×10^{10} Bq
Activity (A)	rutherford	Rd	10^{6} s^{−1}	1946	1000000 Bq
Exposure (X)	coulomb per kilogram	C/kg	C⋅kg^{−1} of air	1974	SI unit
Exposure (X)	röntgen	R	esu / 0.001293 g of air	1928	2.58×10^{−4} C/kg
Absorbed dose (D)	gray	Gy	J⋅kg^{−1}	1974	SI unit
Absorbed dose (D)	erg per gram	erg/g	erg⋅g^{−1}	1950	1.0×10^{−4} Gy
Absorbed dose (D)	rad	rad	100 erg⋅g^{−1}	1953	0.010 Gy
Equivalent dose (H)	sievert	Sv	J⋅kg^{−1} × W_{R}	1977	SI unit
Equivalent dose (H)	röntgen equivalent man	rem	100 erg⋅g^{−1} × W_{R}	1971	0.010 Sv
Effective dose (E)	sievert	Sv	J⋅kg^{−1} × W_{R} × W_{T}	1977	SI unit
Effective dose (E)	röntgen equivalent man	rem	100 erg⋅g^{−1} × W_{R} × W_{T}	1971	0.010 Sv

== See also ==
- Becquerel
- Curie (unit)
- Radiation
- Gray (unit)
- Roentgen (unit)
- Roentgen equivalent man (rem)
- Sievert
- Order of magnitude (unit)
