= F-Factor (diet) =

High fiber diet plan

F-Factor is a high fiber diet plan created by Registered Dietitian Tanya Zuckerbrot. It includes a diet plan, a standard food line, books, and other products. The diet focuses on consumption of lean proteins and high-fiber carbohydrates.

== History ==
The F-Factor brand was created by New York dietitian Tanya Zuckerbrot, who developed the plan based on dietary adjustments she initially made for herself and her clients. The diet consisted of high-fiber carbs and lean protein, which became the base for The F-Factor Diet plan. In 2006, she published the book, The F-Factor Diet, which outlined the F-Factor plan. She would go on to expand her private practice in New York one year later.

In 2011, F-Factor foods began being served in restaurants.

The diet was endorsed by Megyn Kelly in her 2016 autobiography, Settle for More, in which Kelly stated she used the diet after giving birth, in order to address weight gained during pregnancy.

In 2018, F-Factor launched a line of all-natural fiber-rich products.

== Overview ==
The F-Factor Diet is structured around four components: consumption of fiber-rich carbohydrates, allowances for dining out and alcohol usage, and reduced exercise requirements. It advocates using lean proteins with high-fiber carbohydrates. According to the program, the high-fiber approach is designed to limit feelings of hunger or deprivation. The "F" stands for fiber, a non-digestible part of carbohydrates. The diet does not require users to cut out fat, carbs, or alcohol.

F-Factor also provides nutritional counseling services and has its own brand of food and recipes.

== Reception ==
The F-Factor Diet book was reviewed by Publishers Weekly and criticized by influencer Emily Gellis Lande, as published in The New York Times. The story was featured in a 2022 episode of the Casey Wilson podcast, Fed Up, and was also featured in a 2023 episode of the Hulu series, The Age of Influence.

== See also ==
- F-plan
- Pritikin diet
