= Specific activity =

Activity per unit mass of a radionuclide

Activity
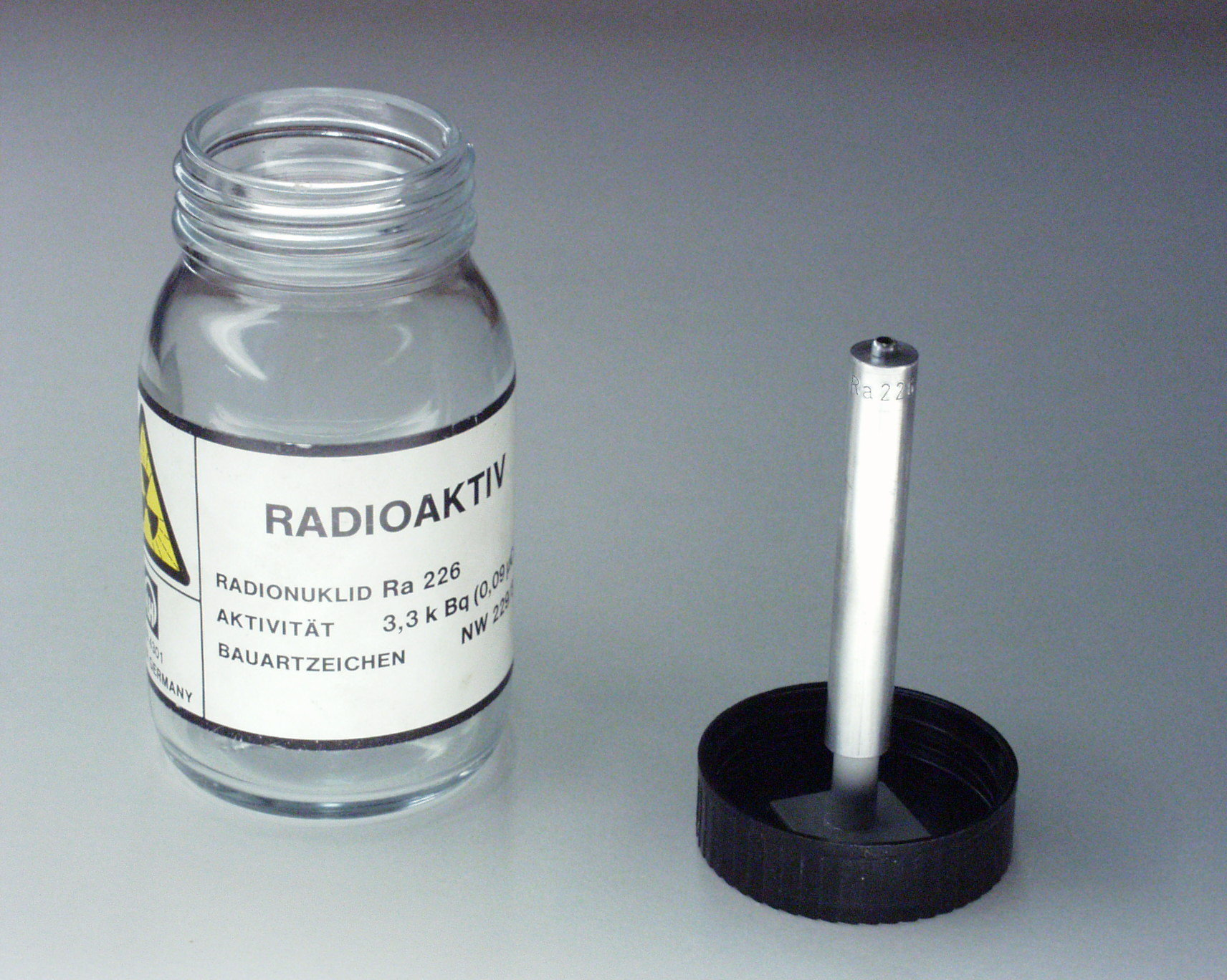
- Ra 226 radiation source. Activity 3300 Bq (3.3 kBq)
- Common symbols: A
- SI unit: becquerel
- Other units: rutherford, curie
- In SI base units: s^{−1}

Specific activity
- Common symbols: a
- SI unit: becquerel per kilogram
- Other units: rutherford per gram, curie per gram
- In SI base units: s^{−1}⋅kg^{−1}

Specific activity (symbol a) is the activity per unit mass of a radionuclide and is a physical property of that radionuclide. It is usually given in units of becquerel per kilogram (Bq/kg), but another commonly used unit of specific activity is the curie per gram (Ci/g). 1 Ci/g = 37 TBq/kg.

In the context of radioactivity, activity or total activity (symbol A) is a physical quantity defined as the number of radioactive transformations per second that occur in a particular radionuclide. The unit of activity is the becquerel (symbol Bq), which is defined equivalent to reciprocal seconds (symbol s^{−1}). The older, non-SI unit of activity is the curie (Ci), which is 3.7×10^{10} radioactive decays per second (37 GBq). Another unit of activity is the rutherford (Rd), which is defined as 1×10^{6} radioactive decays per second (1 MBq).

The specific activity should not be confused with level of exposure to ionizing radiation and thus the exposure or absorbed dose, which is the quantity important in assessing the effects of ionizing radiation on humans.

Since the probability of radioactive decay for a given radionuclide within a set time interval is fixed (with some slight exceptions, see changing decay rates), the number of decays that occur in a given time of a given mass (and hence a specific number of atoms) of that radionuclide is also a fixed (ignoring statistical fluctuations).

== Formulation ==
=== Relationship between λ and t_{1/2} ===
Radioactivity is expressed as the decay rate of a particular radionuclide with decay constant λ and the number of atoms N:

$$-\frac{dN}{dt} = \lambda N.$$

The integral solution is described by exponential decay:

$$N = N_0 e^{-\lambda t},$$

where N_{0} is the initial quantity of atoms at time t = 0.

Half-life t_{1/2} is defined as the length of time for half of a given quantity of radioactive atoms to undergo radioactive decay:

$$\frac{N_0}{2} = N_0 e^{-\lambda t_{1/2}}.$$

Taking the natural logarithm of both sides, the half-life is given by

$$t_{1/2} = \frac{\ln 2}{\lambda}.$$

Conversely, the decay constant λ can be derived from the half-life t_{1/2} as

$$\lambda = \frac{\ln 2}{t_{1/2}}.$$

=== Calculation of specific activity ===
The mass of the radionuclide is given by

$${m} = \frac{N}{N_\text{A}} [\text{mol}] \times {M} [\text{g/mol}],$$

where M is molar mass of the radionuclide, and N_{A} is the Avogadro constant. Practically, the mass number A of the radionuclide is within a fraction of 1 % of the molar mass expressed in g/mol and can be used as an approximation.

Specific radioactivity a is defined as radioactivity per unit mass of the radionuclide:

$$a [\text{Bq/g}] = \frac{\lambda N}{M N/N_\text{A}} = \frac{\lambda N_\text{A}}{M}.$$

Thus, specific radioactivity can also be described by

$$a = \frac{N_\text{A} \ln 2}{t_{1/2} \times M}.$$

This equation is simplified to

$$a [\text{Bq/g}] \approx \frac{4.17 \times 10^{23} [\text{mol}^{-1}]}{t_{1/2} [\text{s}] \times M [\text{g/mol}]}.$$

When the unit of half-life is in years instead of seconds:

$$\begin{align}
a [\text{Bq/g}] &= \frac{4.17 \times 10^{23} [\text{mol}^{-1}]}{t_{1/2}[\text{year}] \times 365 \times 24 \times 60 \times 60 [\text{s/year}] \times M} \\[1ex]
&\approx \frac{1.32 \times 10^{16} [\text{mol}^{-1}{\cdot}\text{s}^{-1}{\cdot}\text{year}]}{t_{1/2} [\text{year}] \times M [\text{g/mol}]}.
\end{align}$$

==== Example: specific activity of Ra-226 ====
For example, specific radioactivity of radium-226 with a half-life of 1600 years is obtained as

$$a_\text{Ra-226}[\text{Bq/g}] = \frac{1.32 \times 10^{16}}{1600 \times 226} \approx 3.7 \times 10^{10} [\text{Bq/g}].$$

This value derived from radium-226 was defined as unit of radioactivity known as the curie (Ci).

=== Calculation of half-life from specific activity ===
Experimentally measured specific activity can be used to calculate the half-life of a radionuclide.

Where decay constant λ is related to specific radioactivity a by the following equation:

$$\lambda = \frac{a \times M}{N_\text{A}}.$$

Therefore, the half-life can also be described by

$$t_{1/2} = \frac{N_\text{A} \ln 2}{a \times M}.$$

==== Example: half-life of Rb-87 ====
One gram of rubidium-87 and a radioactivity count rate that, after taking solid angle effects into account, is consistent with a decay rate of 3200 decays per second corresponds to a specific activity of 3.2×10^{6} Bq/kg. Rubidium atomic mass is 87 g mol^{−1}, so one gram is 1/87 of a mole. Plugging in the numbers:

$$\begin{align}
t_{1/2} =
\frac{N_\text{A} \times \ln 2}{a \times M}
&\approx \frac{6.022 \times 10^{23}\text{ mol}^{-1} \times 0.693}
{3200\text{ s}^{-1}{\cdot}\text{g}^{-1} \times 87\text{ g/mol}} \\[1ex]
&\approx 1.5 \times 10^{18}\text{ s} \approx 47\text{ billion years}.
\end{align}$$

=== Other calculations ===
Relation between some ionizing radiation units

For a given mass m (in grams) of an isotope with atomic mass m_{a} (in g mol^{−1}) and a half-life of t_{1/2} (in s), the radioactivity can be calculated using:

$$A_\text{Bq} = \frac{m} {m_\text{a}} N_\text{A} \frac{\ln 2} {t_{1/2}}$$

With $N_\text{A}$ = 6.02214076×10^{23} mol^{−1}, the Avogadro constant.

Since $m/m_\text{a}$ is the number of moles ($n$), the amount of radioactivity $A$ can be calculated by:

$$A_\text{Bq} = nN_\text{A} \frac{\ln 2} {t_{1/2}}$$

For instance, on average each gram of potassium contains 117 micrograms of ^{40}K (all other naturally occurring isotopes are stable) that has a t_{1/2} of 1.277×10^{9} years = 4.030×10^{16} s, and has an atomic mass of 39.964 g/mol, so the amount of radioactivity associated with a gram of potassium is 30 Bq.

== Examples ==
Isotope	Half-life	Mass of 1 curie	Specific Activity (a) (activity per 1 kg)
^{232}Th	1.405×10^{10} years	9.1 tonnes	4.07 MBq (110 μCi or 4.07 Rd)
^{238}U	4.471×10^{9} years	2.977 tonnes	12.58 MBq (340 μCi, or 12.58 Rd)
^{235}U	7.038×10^{8} years	463 kg	79.92 MBq (2.160 mCi, or 79.92 Rd)
^{40}K	1.25×10^{9} years	140 kg	262.7 MBq (7.1 mCi, or 262.7 Rd)
^{129}I	15.7×10^{6} years	5.66 kg	6.66 GBq (180 mCi, or 6.66 kRd)
^{99}Tc	211×10^{3} years	58 g	629 GBq (17 Ci, or 629 kRd)
^{239}Pu	24.11×10^{3} years	16 g	2.331 TBq (63 Ci, or 2.331 MRd)
^{240}Pu	6563 years	4.4 g	8.51 TBq (230 Ci, or 8.51MRd)
^{14}C	5730 years	0.22 g	166.5 TBq (4.5 kCi, or 166.5 MRd)
^{226}Ra	1601 years	1.01 g	36.63 TBq (990 Ci, or 36.63 MRd)
^{241}Am	432.6 years	0.29 g	126.91 TBq (3.43 kCi, or 126.91 MRd)
^{238}Pu	88 years	59 mg	629 TBq (17 kCi, or 629 MRd)
^{137}Cs	30.17 years	12 mg	3.071 PBq (83 kCi, or 3.071 GRd)
^{90}Sr	28.8 years	7.2 mg	5.143 PBq (139 kCi, or 5.143 GRd)
^{241}Pu	14 years	9.4 mg	3.922 PBq (106 kCi, or 3.922 GRd)
^{3}H	12.32 years	104 μg	355.977 PBq (9.621 MCi, or 355.977 GRd)
^{228}Ra	5.75 years	3.67 mg	10.101 PBq (273 kCi, or 10.101 GRd)
^{60}Co	1925 days	883 μg	41.884 PBq (1.132 MCi, or 41.884 GRd)
^{210}Po	138 days	223 μg	165.908 PBq (4.484 MCi, or 165.908 GRd)
^{131}I	8.02 days	8 μg	4.625 EBq (125 MCi, or 4.625 TRd)
^{123}I	13 hours	518 ng	71.41 EBq (1.93 GCi, or 71.41 TRd)
^{212}Pb	10.64 hours	719 ng	51.43 EBq (1.39 GCi, or 51.43 TRd)

== Applications ==
The specific activity of radionuclides is particularly relevant when it comes to select them for production for therapeutic pharmaceuticals, as well as for immunoassays or other diagnostic procedures, or assessing radioactivity in certain environments, among several other biomedical applications.
