= Elastic scattering =

Particle collisions conserving kinetic energy

Elastic scattering is a form of particle scattering in scattering theory, nuclear physics and particle physics. In this process, the internal states of the particles involved stay the same. In the non-relativistic case, where the relative velocities of the particles are much less than the speed of light, elastic scattering simply means that the total kinetic energy of the system is conserved. At relativistic velocities, elastic scattering also requires the final state to have the same number of particles as the initial state and for them to be of the same kind.

== Rutherford scattering ==
When the incident particle, such as an alpha particle or electron, is diffracted in the Coulomb potential of atoms and molecules, the elastic scattering process is called Rutherford scattering. In many electron diffraction techniques like reflection high energy electron diffraction (RHEED), transmission electron diffraction (TED), and gas electron diffraction (GED), where the incident electrons have sufficiently high energy (>10 keV), the elastic electron scattering becomes the main component of the scattering process and the scattering intensity is expressed as a function of the momentum transfer defined as the difference between the momentum vector of the incident electron and that of the scattered electron.

== Optical elastic scattering ==
- In Thomson scattering light interacts with electrons (this is the low-energy limit of Compton scattering).
- In Rayleigh scattering a medium composed of particles whose sizes are much smaller than the wavelength scatters light sideways. In this scattering process, the energy (and therefore the wavelength) of the incident light is conserved and only its direction is changed. In this case, the scattering intensity is inversely proportional to the fourth power of the reciprocal wavelength of the light.

== Nuclear particle physics ==
For particles with the mass of a proton or greater, elastic scattering is one of the main methods by which the particles interact with matter. At relativistic energies, protons, neutrons, helium ions, and HZE ions will undergo numerous elastic collisions before they are dissipated. This is a major concern with many types of ionizing radiation, including galactic cosmic rays, solar proton events, free neutrons in nuclear weapon design and nuclear reactor design, spaceship design, and the study of the Earth's magnetic field. In designing an effective biological shield, proper attention must be made to the linear energy transfer of the particles as they propagate through the shield. In nuclear reactors, the neutron's mean free path is critical as it undergoes elastic scattering on its way to becoming a slow-moving thermal neutron.

Besides elastic scattering, charged particles also undergo effects from their elementary charge, which repels them away from nuclei and causes their path to be curved inside an electric field. Particles can also undergo inelastic scattering and capture due to nuclear reactions. Protons and neutrons do this more often than heavier particles. Neutrons are also capable of causing fission in an incident nucleus. Light nuclei like deuterium and lithium can combine in nuclear fusion.

== See also ==
- Elastic collision
- Inelastic scattering
- Scattering theory
- Thomson scattering
