= Radiobiology evidence for protons and HZE nuclei =

Studies with protons and HZE nuclei of relative biological effectiveness for molecular, cellular, and tissue endpoints, including tumor induction, demonstrate risk from space radiation exposure. This evidence may be extrapolated to applicable chronic conditions that are found in space and from the heavy ion beams that are used at accelerators.

== Cancer induction by space radiation ==
A necessary step for improving space radiation cancer risk assessment is to perform studies on the molecular pathways that can cause cancer initiation and progression, and to extend these studies to learn how such pathways can be disrupted by HZE ions, including both genetic and epigenetic modifications that are noted as the hallmarks of cancer (Figure 4-8). The goal of this research is to establish a more mechanistic approach to estimating risk and to answer questions, including whether HZE effects can be scaled from those of gamma rays, whether risk is linear with low dose-rate, and how individual radiation sensitivity impacts the risks for astronauts, a population that is selected for many factors related to excellence in health.

Figure 4–8. The hallmarks of cancer and possible mechanisms of radiation damage that lead to these changes observed in all human tumors.

== Initial biological events ==
Energy deposition by HZE ions is highly heterogeneous with a localized contribution along the trajectory of each particle and lateral diffusion of energetic electrons (delta rays) that are many micrometers from the ion's path. These particles are, therefore, characterized by a high-LET, however, they contain a low-LET component fur to high-energy electrons that are ejected by ions as they traverse tissue. Biophysical models have shown that the energy deposition events by high-LET radiation produce differential DNA lesions, including complex DNA breaks, and that there are qualitative differences between high- and low-LET radiation, in both the induction and the repair of DNA damage. The number of DNA single-strand breaks (SSBs) and double-strand breaks (DSBs) that are produced by radiation varies little with radiation type: however, for high-LET radiation, a higher fraction of DNA damages are complex; i.e., clusters containing mixtures of two or more of the various types of damages (SSB, DSB, etc.) within a localized region of DNA. Complex damage is uncommon for endogenous damage or low-LET radiation, and has been associated with the increased RBE of densely ionizing radiation. The repair of DSB is known to occur through direct end-joining and homologous recombination processes. Indications are that:

- for high-LET radiation, where complex DSBs occur with high frequency, little repair occurs, leading to cell death

or

- the mis-rejoining of unrepairable ends with other radiation-induced DSB leads to large DNA deletions and chromosome aberrations.

While the high effectiveness in cell killing provides the rationale for heavy ion cancer therapy (hadron therapy), residual damage in surviving cells is of concern for carcinogenesis.

=== Chromosome damage and mutation ===
Heavy charged particles are very effective at producing chromosomal exchanges with RBE values exceeding 30 in interphase (as visualized using premature chromosome condensation) and 10 at the post-irradiation mitosis for energetic iron (Fe) ions. The detailed RBE vs. LET relationship that was found for total exchanges is similar to that of earlier studies of mutation and in vitro neoplastic transformation. For all of these endpoints, RBE peaks at around 100 to 200 keV/μm before it decreases at very high-LET. However, the quality of chromosome damage is different when heavy ions are compared to sparsely ionizing radiation. Large differences in gene expression are observed between x-rays and HZE ions, thus reflecting differences in damages response pathways. Qualitative differences in the type of gene mutations have also been reported. Novel multicolor fluorescence painting techniques of human chromosomes have clearly demonstrated that high-LET α-particles and Fe-ions induce many more complex rearrangements will ultimately lead to cell death. In fact, only a small fraction of the initial damage is transduction of late chromosomal damage has also been measured in the progeny of human lymphocytes that were exposed with much higher frequency in the progeny of cells that were exposed to heavy ions compared to gamma rays.

=== Genomic instability ===
Genomic instability has been observed both in vitro and in vivo in the progeny of cells that are irradiated with heavy ions in several model systems. The presence of chromosomes that are lacking telomeres in the progeny of cells that were exposed to heavy ions is particularly interesting. Sabatier et al. found that rearrangements involving telomere regions are associated with chromosomal instability in human fibroblasts that occur many generations after exposure to accelerated heavy ions. Telomere dysfunction plays a crucial role in initiating or sustaining genomic instability, which is a major step in cancer progression. Heavy-ion-induced effects on telomere stability have also been studied using siRNA (small interfering ribonucleic acid) knockdown for components of DNA-dependent protein kinase (DNA-PK) in human lymphoblasts. Differential results were found for gamma rays and HZE nuclei, with iron nuclei being much more effective in producing DSB-telomere fusions after knockdown of DNA-PK. Cells containing telomere-deficient chromosomes will either senesce or undergo breakage-fusion-bridge (B/F/B) cycles, thereby promoting genetic instability. The fate of normal cells that contain a single terminal deletion is unknown, but it has been shown that the loss of a single telomere in cancer cells can result in instability in multiple chromosomes. These recent results suggest that telomere instability could be an important early event in the pathway to cancer induction by HZE nuclei.

=== Cancer and tissue effects ===
Animal studies have not conclusively demonstrated that HZE nuclei have higher carcinogenic effectiveness than low-LET radiation. Studies of animal carcinogenesis with HZE nuclei are extremely limited in number and the use of tumor-prone animals introduces bias into the results. Relative biological effectiveness factors comparing gamma rays to HZE ions were measured in mice or rats for tumors of the skin and of the Harderian or mammary gland, reaching values as high as 25 to 50 at low doses. However, the risk and detriment of cancer will not be fully characterized until the relationship between radiation quality and latency, where tumors appear earlier after high-LET irradiation, is adequately described. The earlier latency and increasing effectiveness that is found with HZE ions that are similar to those in earlier studies with neutrons, together with the lack of response of gamma rays that is seen in many low-dose studies, suggests that the scaling concepts that are used in current risk assessment approaches are unable to describe important qualitative effects, and that relative biological effectiveness factors may, in principle, be indefinable or a faulty concept.

Table 4-12. Tumor Induction Studies with HZE Nuclei
Tumor Model	End-point	HZE type	Reference
Mice (B6CF1)	Life-shortening	C, Ar, Fe	Ainsworth (1986)
Mice (B6CH1)	Harderian gland	He, C, Ar, Fe	Fry et al. (1985)
Mice (B6CH1)	Harderian gland	He, Ne, Fe, Nb	Alpen et al. (1993)
Rat (Sprague-Dawley)	Skin tumors	Ne, Ar, Fe	Burns (1992)
Rat (Sprague-Dawley)	Mammary tumors	Fe	Dicello et al. (2004)
Mice (carcinoma-bearing animal (CBA))	Leukemia, liver tumors	Fe, p, Si	Ullrich, in preparation

Recent studies have debated the relative importance of DNA damage and mutation or extracellular matrix remodeling and other non-targets effects as initiators of carcinogenesis. Tissue effects that are independent of DNA damage and that have been associated with cancer initiation or progression include genomic instability, extracellular matrix remodeling, persistent inflammation, and oxidative damage. Other studies are exploring possible relationships between radiation and the activation of dormant tumors and the modulation of angiogenesis.

So-called bystander or non-targeted effects may have enormous consequences for space exploration. Non-targeted effects may lead to a supra-linear dose-response curve at low doses, perhaps reducing the effectiveness of spacecraft shielding; but it may also provide protection by removing damaged cells from the organism. Both effects challenge the conventional linear no-threshold risk model assumption, which is currently adopted for radioprotection on Earth and in space. These effects also suggest important targets for biological countermeasures that are likely to be more effective than are countermeasures that target DNA damage.

Results in tissues suggest that differences in biological response between high- and low-LET differ depending on the model context that is considered (i.e., 2D vs. 3D vs. animal). As a result of the many types of particles, energies, and doses of interest that are in space, extensive animal experimentation has been prohibited by costs in the past. More recently, however, studies in 3D human coculture are proving to be an effective method with which to study cancer risks in a more realistic context.
