= Spaceflight radiation carcinogenesis =

Cancer causing exposure to ionizing radiation in spaceflight

The Phantom Torso, as seen here in the Destiny laboratory on the International Space Station (ISS), is designed to measure the effects of radiation on organs inside the body by using a torso that is similar to those used to train radiologists on Earth. The torso is equivalent in height and weight to an average adult male. It contains radiation detectors that will measure, in real-time, how much radiation the brain, thyroid, stomach, colon, and heart and lung area receive on a daily basis. The data will be used to determine how the body reacts to and shields its internal organs from radiation, which will be important for longer duration space flights.

Astronauts are exposed to approximately 72 millisieverts (mSv) while on six-month-duration missions to the International Space Station (ISS). Longer 3-year missions to Mars, however, have the potential to expose astronauts to radiation in excess of 1000 mSv. Without the protection provided by Earth's magnetic field, the rate of exposure is dramatically increased. The risk of cancer caused by ionizing radiation is well documented at radiation doses beginning at 100 mSv and above.

Related radiological effect studies have shown that survivors of the atomic bomb explosions in Hiroshima and Nagasaki, nuclear reactor workers and patients who have undergone therapeutic radiation treatments have received low-linear energy transfer (LET) radiation (x-rays and gamma rays) doses in the same 50-2,000 mSv range.

== Composition of space radiation ==
While in space, astronauts are exposed to radiation which is mostly composed of high-energy protons, helium nuclei (alpha particles), and high-atomic-number ions (HZE ions), as well as secondary radiation from nuclear reactions from spacecraft parts or tissue.

The ionization patterns in molecules, cells, tissues and the resulting biological effects are distinct from typical terrestrial radiation (x-rays and gamma rays, which are low-LET radiation). Galactic cosmic rays (GCRs) from outside the Milky Way galaxy consist mostly of highly energetic protons with a small component of HZE ions.

Prominent HZE ions:

- Carbon (C)
- Oxygen (O)
- Magnesium (Mg)
- Silicon (Si)
- Iron (Fe)

GCR energy spectra peaks (with median energy peaks up to 1000 MeV/Da) and nuclei (energies up to 10000 MeV/Da) are important contributors to the dose equivalent.

== Uncertainties in cancer projections ==
One of the main roadblocks to interplanetary travel is the risk of cancer caused by radiation exposure. The largest contributors to this roadblock are: (1) The large uncertainties associated with cancer risk estimates, (2) The unavailability of simple and effective countermeasures and (3) The inability to determine the effectiveness of countermeasures. Operational parameters that need to be optimized to help mitigate these risks include:

- length of space missions
- crew age
- crew sex
- shielding
- biological countermeasures

=== Major uncertainties ===
- effects on biological damage related to differences between space radiation and x-rays
- dependence of risk on dose-rates in space related to the biology of DNA repair, cell regulation and tissue responses
- predicting solar particle events (SPEs)
- extrapolation from experimental data to humans and between human populations
- individual radiation sensitivity factors (genetic, epigenetic, dietary or "healthy worker" effects)

=== Minor uncertainties ===
- data on galactic cosmic ray environments
- physics of shielding assessments related to transmission properties of radiation through materials and tissue
- microgravity effects on biological responses to radiation
- errors in human data (statistical, dosimetry or recording inaccuracies)

Quantitative methods have been developed to propagate uncertainties that contribute to cancer risk estimates. The contribution of microgravity effects on space radiation has not yet been estimated, but it is expected to be small. However as microgravity has been shown to modulate cancer progression, more research is needed into the combined effects of microgravity and radiation on carcinogenesis. The effects of changes in oxygen levels or in immune dysfunction on cancer risks are largely unknown and are of great concern during space flight.

== Types of cancer caused by radiation exposure ==
Studies are being conducted on populations accidentally exposed to radiation (such as Chernobyl, production sites, and Hiroshima and Nagasaki). These studies show strong evidence for cancer morbidity as well as mortality risks at more than 12 tissue sites. The largest risks for adults who have been studied include several types of leukemia, including myeloid leukemia and acute lymphatic lymphoma as well as tumors of the lung, breast, stomach, colon, bladder and liver. Inter-sex variations are very likely due to the differences in the natural incidence of cancer in males and females. Another variable is the additional risk for cancer of the breast, ovaries and lungs in females. There is also evidence of a declining risk of cancer caused by radiation with increasing age, but the magnitude of this reduction above the age of 30 is uncertain.

It is unknown whether high-LET radiation could cause the same types of tumors as low-LET radiation, but differences should be expected.

The ratio of a dose of high-LET radiation to a dose of x-rays or gamma rays that produce the same biological effect are called relative biological effectiveness (RBE) factors. The types of tumors in humans who are exposed to space radiation will be different from those who are exposed to low-LET radiation. This is evidenced by a study that observed mice with neutrons and have RBEs that vary with the tissue type and strain.

== Measured rate of cancer among astronauts ==
The measured change rate of cancer is restricted by limited statistics. A study published in Scientific Reports looked over 301 U.S. astronauts and 117 Soviet and Russian cosmonauts, and found no measurable increase in cancer mortality compared to the general population, as reported by LiveScience.

An earlier 1998 study came to similar conclusions, with no statistically significant increase in cancer among astronauts compared to the reference group.

== Approaches for setting acceptable risk levels ==
The various approaches to setting acceptable levels of radiation risk are summarized below:

Comparison of radiation doses – includes the amount detected on the trip from Earth to Mars by the RAD on the MSL (2011–2013).

- Unlimited Radiation Risk – NASA management, the families and loved ones of astronauts, and taxpayers would find this approach unacceptable.
- Comparison to Occupational Fatalities in Less-safe Industries – The life-loss from attributable radiation cancer death is less than that from most other occupational deaths. At this time, this comparison would also be very restrictive on ISS operations because of continued improvements in ground-based occupational safety over the last 20 years.
- Comparison to Cancer Rates in General Population – The number of years of life-loss from radiation-induced cancer deaths can be significantly larger than from cancer deaths in the general population, which often occur late in life (> age 70 years) and with significantly less numbers of years of life-loss.
- Doubling Dose for 20 Years Following Exposure – Provides a roughly equivalent comparison based on life-loss from other occupational risks or background cancer fatalities during a worker's career, however, this approach negates the role of mortality effects later in life.
- Use of Ground-based Worker Limits – Provides a reference point equivalent to the standard that is set on Earth, and recognizes that astronauts face other risks. However, ground workers remain well below dose limits, and are largely exposed to low-LET radiation where the uncertainties of biological effects are much smaller than for space radiation.

NCRP Report No. 153 provides a more recent review of cancer and other radiation risks. This report also identifies and describes the information needed to make radiation protection recommendations beyond LEO, contains a comprehensive summary of the current body of evidence for radiation-induced health risks and also makes recommendations on areas requiring future experimentation.

== Current permissible exposure limits ==
=== Career cancer risk limits ===
Astronauts' radiation exposure limit is not to exceed 3% of the risk of exposure-induced death (REID) from fatal cancer over their career. It is NASA's policy to ensure a 95% confidence level (CL) that this limit is not exceeded. These limits are applicable to all missions in low Earth orbit (LEO) as well as lunar missions that are less than 180 days in duration. In the United States, the legal occupational exposure limits for adult workers is set at an effective dose of 50 mSv annually.

=== Cancer risk to dose relationship ===
The relationship between radiation exposure and risk is both age- and sex-specific due to latency effects and differences in tissue types, sensitivities, and life spans between sexes. These relationships are estimated using the methods that are recommended by the NCRP and more recent radiation epidemiology information

=== Principle of 'as low as reasonably achievable' ===
The as low as reasonably achievable (ALARA) principle is a legal requirement intended to ensure astronaut safety. An important function of ALARA is to ensure that astronauts do not approach radiation limits and that such limits are not considered as "tolerance values". ALARA is especially important for space missions in view of the large uncertainties in cancer and other risk projection models. Mission programs and terrestrial occupational procedures resulting in radiation exposures to astronauts are required to find cost-effective approaches to implement ALARA.

== Evaluating career limits ==
Organ (T)	Tissue weighting factor (w_{T})
Gonads	0.20
Bone Marrow (red)	0.12
Colon	0.12
Lung	0.12
Stomach	0.12
Bladder	0.05
Breast	0.05
Liver	0.05
Esophagus	0.05
Thyroid	0.05
Skin	0.01
Bone Surface	0.01
Remainder*	0.05
_{*Adrenals, brain, upper intestine, small intestine, kidney, muscle, pancreas, spleen, thymus and uterus.}

The risk of cancer is calculated by using radiation dosimetry and physics methods.

For the purpose of determining radiation exposure limits at NASA, the probability of fatal cancer is calculated as shown below:

1. The body is divided into a set of sensitive tissues, and each tissue, T, is assigned a weight, w_{T}, according to its estimated contribution to cancer risk.
2. The absorbed dose, D_{γ}, that is delivered to each tissue is determined from measured dosimetry. For the purpose of estimating radiation risk to an organ, the quantity characterizing the ionization density is the LET (keV/μm).
3. For a given interval of LET, between L and ΔL, the dose-equivalent risk (in units of sievert) to a tissue, T, H_{γ}(L) is calculated as
  $H_\gamma (L) = Q(L)D_\gamma (L)$
  where the quality factor, Q(L), is obtained according to the International Commission on Radiological Protection (ICRP).
4. The average risk to a tissue, T, due to all types of radiation contributing to the dose is given by
  $H_\gamma = \int D_\gamma (L)Q(L)dL$
  or, since $D_\gamma (L) = LF_\gamma (L)$, where F_{γ}(L) is the fluence of particles with LET = L, traversing the organ,
  $H_\gamma = \int dLQ(L)F_\gamma (L)L$
5. The effective dose is used as a summation over radiation type and tissue using the tissue weighting factors, w_{γ}
  $E=\sum_\gamma w_\gamma H_\gamma$
6. For a mission of duration t, the effective dose will be a function of time, E(t), and the effective dose for mission i will be
  $E_i = \int E(t) dt$
7. The effective dose is used to scale the mortality rate for radiation-induced death from the Japanese survivor data, applying the average of the multiplicative and additive transfer models for solid cancers and the additive transfer model for leukemia by applying life-table methodologies that are based on U.S. population data for background cancer and all causes of death mortality rates. A dose-dose rate effectiveness factor (DDREF) of 2 is assumed.

=== Evaluating cumulative radiation risks ===
The cumulative cancer fatality risk (%REID) to an astronaut for occupational radiation exposures, N, is found by applying life-table methodologies that can be approximated at small values of %REID by summing over the tissue-weighted effective dose, E_{i}, as

$$\text{Risk} = \sum_{i=1}^N E_i R_0 (\mathrm{age}_i, \mathrm{sex})$$

where R_{0} are the age- and sex- specific radiation mortality rates per unit dose.

For organ dose calculations, NASA uses the model of Billings et al. to represent the self-shielding of the human body in a water-equivalent mass approximation. Consideration of the orientation of the human body relative to vehicle shielding should be made if it is known, especially for SPEs

Confidence levels for career cancer risks are evaluated using methods that are specified by the NPRC in Report No. 126. These levels were modified to account for the uncertainty in quality factors and space dosimetry.

The uncertainties that were considered in evaluating the 95% confidence levels are the uncertainties in:

- Human epidemiology data, including uncertainties in
  - statistics limitations of epidemiology data
  - dosimetry of exposed cohorts
  - bias, including misclassification of cancer deaths, and
  - the transfer of risk across populations.
- The DDREF factor that is used to scale acute radiation exposure data to low-dose and dose-rate radiation exposures.
- The radiation quality factor (Q) as a function of LET.
- Space dosimetry

The so-called "unknown uncertainties" from the NCRP report No. 126 are ignored by NASA.

== Models of cancer risks and uncertainties ==
=== Life-table methodology ===
The double-detriment life-table approach is what is recommended by the NPRC to measure radiation cancer mortality risks. The age-specific mortality of a population is followed over its entire life span with competing risks from radiation and all other causes of death described.

For a homogenous population receiving an effective dose E at age a_{E}, the probability of dying in the age-interval from a to a + 1 is described by the background mortality-rate for all causes of death, M(a), and the radiation cancer mortality rate, m(E,a_{E},a), as:

$$q(E,a_E,a)=\frac{M(a)+m(E,a_E,a)}{1+\frac{1}{2}\left[ M(a)+m(E,a_E,a)\right]}$$

The survival probability to age, a, following an exposure, E at age a_{E}, is:

$$S(E,a_E,a)= \prod_{u=a_E}^{a-1} \left[ 1-q(E,a_E,u)\right]$$

The excessive lifetime risk (ELR – the increased probability that an exposed individual will die from cancer) is defined by the difference in the conditional survival probabilities for the exposed and the unexposed groups as:

$$\mathrm{ELR}=\sum_{a=a_E}^ \infty \left[M(a)+m(E,a_E,a)\right]S(E,a_E,a)-\sum_{a=a_E}^ \infty M(a)S(0,a_E,a)$$

A minimum latency-time of 10 years is often used for low-LET radiation. Alternative assumptions should be considered for high-LET radiation. The REID (the lifetime risk that an individual in the population will die from cancer caused by radiation exposure) is defined by:

$$\mathrm{REID}=\sum_{a=a_E}^\infty m(E,a_E,a)S(E,a_E,a)$$

Generally, the value of the REID exceeds the value of the ELR by 10-20%.

The average loss of life-expectancy, LLE, in the population is defined by:

$$\mathrm{LLE}=\sum_{a=a_E}^\infty S(0,a_E,a) - \sum_{a=a_E}^\infty S(E,a_E,a)$$

The loss of life-expectancy among exposure-induced-deaths (LLE − REID) is defined by:

$$\mathrm{LLE}-\mathrm{REID}=\frac {\mathrm{LLE}}{\mathrm{REID}}$$

=== Uncertainties in low-LET epidemiology data ===
The low-LET mortality rate per sievert, m_{i} is written

$$m(E,a_x,a) = \frac {m_0 (E,a_x,a)}{\mathrm{DDREF}} \frac {x_D x_s x_T x_B}{x_{Dr}}$$

where m_{0} is the baseline mortality rate per sievert and x_{α} are quantiles (random variables) whose values are sampled from associated probability distribution functions (PDFs), P(X_{a}).

NCRP, in Report No. 126, defines the following subjective PDFs, P(X_{a}), for each factor that contributes to the acute low-LET risk projection:

1. P_{dosimetry} is the random and systematic errors in the estimation of the doses received by atomic-bomb blast survivors.
2. P_{statistical} is the distribution in uncertainty in the point estimate of the risk coefficient, r_{0}.
3. P_{bias} is any bias resulting for over- or under-reporting cancer deaths.
4. P_{transfer} is the uncertainty in the transfer of cancer risk following radiation exposure from the Japanese population to the U.S. population.
5. P_{Dr} is the uncertainty in the knowledge of the extrapolation of risks to low dose and dose-rates, which are embodied in the DDREF.

== Risk in context of exploration mission operational scenarios ==
The accuracy of galactic cosmic ray environmental models, transport codes and nuclear interaction cross sections allow NASA to predict space environments and organ exposure that may be encountered on long-duration space missions. The lack of knowledge of the biological effects of radiation exposure raise major questions about risk prediction.

The cancer risk projection for space missions is found by

$$m_J(E,a_E,a)_{lJ}(E,a_E,a) \int dL \frac{dF}{dL}LQ_{trial-J}(L)X_{L-J}$$

where $\frac{dF}{dL}$ represents the folding of predictions of tissue-weighted LET spectra behind spacecraft shielding with the radiation mortality rate to form a rate for trial J.

Alternatively, particle-specific energy spectra, F_{j}(E), for each ion, j, can be used

$$m_J (E,a_E,a) = m_{lJ}(E,a_E,a) \sum_j (E)L(E)Q_{trial-J}(L(E))x_{L-J}$$.

The result of either of these equations is inserted into the expression for the REID.

Related probability distribution functions (PDFs) are grouped together into a combined probability distribution function, P_{cmb}(x). These PDFs are related to the risk coefficient of the normal form (dosimetry, bias and statistical uncertainties). After a sufficient number of trials have been completed (approximately 10^{5}), the results for the REID estimated are binned and the median values and confidence intervals are found.

The chi-squared (χ^{2}) test is used for determining whether two separate PDFs are significantly different (denoted p_{1}(R_{i}) and p_{2}(R_{i}), respectively). Each p(R_{i}) follows a Poisson distribution with variance $\sqrt{p(R_i)}$.

The χ^{2} test for n degrees of freedom characterizing the dispersion between the two distributions is

$$\chi^2=\sum_n \frac{\left[p_1(R_n)-p_2(R_n)\right]^2}{\sqrt{p_1^2(R_n)+p_2^2(R_n)}}$$.

The probability, P(ņχ^{2}), that the two distributions are the same is calculated once χ^{2} is determined.

=== Radiation carcinogenesis mortality rates ===
Age-and sex-dependent mortality rate per unit dose, multiplied by the radiation quality factor and reduced by the DDREF is used for projecting lifetime cancer fatality risks. Acute gamma ray exposures are estimated. The additivity of effects of each component in a radiation field is also assumed.

Rates are approximated using data gathered from Japanese atomic bomb survivors. There are two different models that are considered when transferring risk from Japanese to U.S. populations.

- Multiplicative transfer model – assumes that radiation risks are proportional to spontaneous or background cancer risks.
- Additive transfer model – assumes that radiation risk acts independently of other cancer risks.

The NCRP recommends a mixture model to be used that contains fractional contributions from both methods.

The radiation mortality rate is defined as:

$$m(E,a_E,a)=\left[\mathrm{ERR}(a_E, a)M_\text{c}(a)+(1-v)\mathrm{EAR}(a_E,a)\right]{\frac{\sum_LQ(L)F(L)L}{\mathrm{DDREF}}}$$

Where:

- ERR = excess relative risk per sievert
- EAR = excess additive risk per sievert
- M_{c}(a) = the sex- and age-specific cancer mortality rate in the U.S. population
- F = the tissue-weighted fluence
- L = the LET
- v = the fractional division between the assumption of the multiplicative and additive risk transfer models. For solid cancer, it is assumed that v=1/2 and for leukemia, it is assumed that v=0.

== Biological and physical countermeasures ==
Identifying effective countermeasures that reduce the risk of biological damage is still a long-term goal for space researchers. These countermeasures are probably not needed for extended duration lunar missions, but will be needed for other long-duration missions to Mars and beyond. On 31 May 2013, NASA scientists reported that a possible human mission to Mars may involve a great radiation risk based on the amount of energetic particle radiation detected by the RAD on the Mars Science Laboratory while traveling from the Earth to Mars in 2011-2012.

There are three fundamental ways to reduce exposure to ionizing radiation:

- increasing the distance from the radiation source
- reducing the exposure time
- shielding (i.e.: a physical barrier)

Shielding is a plausible option, but due to current launch mass restrictions, it is prohibitively costly. Also, the current uncertainties in risk projection prevent the actual benefit of shielding from being determined. Strategies such as drugs and dietary supplements to reduce the effects of radiation, as well as the selection of crew members are being evaluated as viable options for reducing exposure to radiation and effects of irradiation. Shielding is an effective protective measure for solar particle events. As far as shielding from GCR, high-energy radiation is very penetrating and the effectiveness of radiation shielding depends on the atomic make-up of the material used.

Antioxidants are effectively used to prevent the damage caused by radiation injury and oxygen poisoning (the formation of reactive oxygen species), but since antioxidants work by rescuing cells from a particular form of cell death (apoptosis), they may not protect against damaged cells that can initiate tumor growth.

=== Spacecraft shielding ===
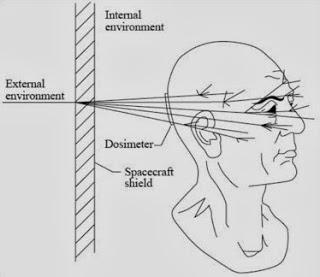
Standard spacecraft shielding, integrated into hull design, is strong protection from most solar radiation. This usefulness is defeated by high-energy cosmic rays, which it effectively splits into showers of secondary particles. This shower of secondary particles may be reduced by the use of hydrogen-dense materials or light elements for shielding.

Material shielding can be effective against galactic cosmic rays, but thin shielding may actually make the problem worse for some of the higher energy rays, because of the increased amount of secondary radiation. The aluminium walls of the ISS, for example, are believed to produce a net reduction in radiation exposure. In interplanetary space, however, it is believed that thin aluminium shielding would give a net increase in radiation exposure; thicker shielding would be needed to block the secondary radiation.

Studies of space radiation shielding should include tissue- or water-equivalent shielding along with the shielding material under study. This observation is readily understood by noting that the average tissue self-shielding of sensitive organs is about 10 cm, and that secondary radiation produced in tissue such as low energy protons, helium, and heavy ions are of high linear energy transfer (LET) and make significant contributions (>25%) to the overall biological damage from GCR. Studies of aluminium, polyethylene, liquid hydrogen, or other shielding materials should include their combination effects against primary and secondary radiation, plus their ability to limit the secondary radiation produced in tissue.

Several strategies are being studied for ameliorating the effects of this radiation hazard for planned human interplanetary spaceflight:

- Spacecraft can be constructed out of hydrogen-rich plastics, rather than aluminium.
- Mass and material shielding:
  - Liquid hydrogen, often used as fuel, tends to give relatively good shielding, while producing relatively low levels of secondary radiation. Therefore, the fuel could be placed so as to act as a form of shielding around the crew. However, as fuel is consumed by the craft, the crew's shielding decreases.
  - Fresh or waste water can contribute to shielding.
  - Asteroids could serve to provide shielding.
- Light active radiation shields based on the charged graphene against gamma rays, where the absorption parameters can be controlled by the negative charge accumulation.
- Magnetic deflection of charged radiation particles and/or electrostatic repulsion is a hypothetical alternative to pure conventional mass shielding under investigation. In theory, power requirements for a 5-meter torus drop from an excessive 10 GW for a simple pure electrostatic shield (too discharged by space electrons) to a moderate 10 kilowatts (kW) by using a hybrid design. However, such complex active shielding is untried, with workability and practicalities more uncertain than material shielding.

Special provisions would also be necessary to protect against a solar proton event, which could increase fluxes to levels that would kill a crew in hours or days rather than months or years. Potential mitigation strategies include providing a small habitable space behind a spacecraft's water supply or with particularly thick walls or providing an option to abort to the protective environment provided by the Earth's magnetosphere. The Apollo mission used a combination of both strategies. Upon receiving confirmation of an SPE, astronauts would move to the Command Module, which had thicker aluminum walls than the Lunar Module, then return to Earth. It was later determined from measurements taken by instruments flown on Apollo that the Command Module would have provided sufficient shielding to prevent significant crew harm.

None of these strategies currently provide a method of protection that would be known to be sufficient while conforming to likely limitations on the mass of the payload at present (around $10,000/kg) launch prices. Scientists such as University of Chicago professor emeritus Eugene Parker are not optimistic it can be solved anytime soon. For passive mass shielding, the required amount could be too heavy to be affordably lifted into space without changes in economics (like hypothetical non-rocket spacelaunch or usage of extraterrestrial resources) — many hundreds of metric tons for a reasonably-sized crew compartment. For instance, a NASA design study for an ambitious permanent large space station envisioned 4 metric tons per square meter (441g/cm2) of silicon dioxide shielding to drop radiation exposure to 2.5 mSv annually (± a factor of 2 uncertainty), less than the tens of millisieverts or more in some populated high natural background radiation areas on Earth. This design was for long term occupancy, hence the low exposure target, and was based around the premise of using a suboptimal shielding material that could theoretically be sourced via a lunar mass driver launching material from the lunar surface. Using more mass efficient shielding materials like water or layers of aluminum and polyethylene, NASA has established ideal shielding goals for spacecraft that still would require at least 20g/cm2. This type of mass is feasible for small temporary shelters, but is still largely intractable for entire living quarters with current launch economics.

Several active shielding methods have been considered that might be less massive than passive shielding, but they remain speculative. Since the type of radiation penetrating farthest through thick material shielding, deep in interplanetary space, is GeV positively charged nuclei, a repulsive electrostatic field has been proposed, but this has problems including plasma instabilities and the power needed for an accelerator constantly keeping the charge from being neutralized by deep-space electrons. A more common proposal is magnetic shielding generated by superconductors (or plasma currents). Among the difficulties with this proposal is that, for a compact system, magnetic fields up to 20 tesla could be required around a crewed spacecraft, higher than the several tesla in MRI machines. Such high fields can produce headaches and migraines in MRI patients, and long-duration exposure to such fields has not been studied. Opposing-electromagnet designs might cancel the field in the crew sections of the spacecraft, but would require more mass. It is also possible to use a combination of a magnetic field with an electrostatic field, with the spacecraft having zero total charge. The hybrid design would theoretically ameliorate the problems, but would be complex and possibly infeasible.

Part of the uncertainty is that the effect of human exposure to galactic cosmic rays is poorly known in quantitative terms. The NASA Space Radiation Laboratory is currently studying the effects of radiation in living organisms as well as protective shielding.

=== Wearable radiation shielding ===
Apart from passive and active radiation shielding methods, which focus on protecting the spacecraft from harmful space radiation, there has been much interest in designing personalized radiation protective suits for astronauts. The reason behind choosing such methods of radiation shielding is that in passive shielding, adding a certain thickness to the spacecraft can increase the mass of the spacecraft by several thousands of kilograms. This mass can surpass the launch constraints and costs several millions of dollars.

On the other hand, active radiation shielding methods is an emerging technology which is still far away in terms of testing and implementation. Even with the simultaneous use of active and passive shielding, wearable protective shielding may be useful, especially in reducing the health effects of SPEs, which generally are composed of particles that have a lower penetrating force than GCR particles. The materials suggested for this type of protective equipment is often polyethylene or other hydrogen rich polymers. Water has also been suggested as a shielding material. The limitation with wearable protective solutions is that they need to be ergonomically compatible with crew needs such as movement inside crew volume. One attempt at creating wearable protection for space radiation was done by the Italian Space Agency, where a garment was proposed that could be filled with recycled water on the signal of incoming SPE.

A collaborative effort between the Israeli Space Agency, StemRad and Lockheed Martin was AstroRad, tested aboard the ISS. The product is designed as an ergonomically suitable protective vest, which can minimize the effective dose by SPE to an extent similar to onboard storm shelters. It also has potential to mildly reduce the effective dose of GCR through extensive use during the mission during such routine activities such as sleeping. This radiation protective garment uses selective shielding methods to protect most radiation-sensitive organs such as BFO, stomach, lungs, and other internal organs, thereby reducing the mass penalty and launch cost.

=== Drugs and medicine ===
Another line of research is the development of drugs that enhance the body's natural capacity to repair damage caused by radiation. Some of the drugs that are being considered are retinoids, which are vitamins with antioxidant properties, and molecules that retard cell division, giving the body time to fix damage before harmful mutations can be duplicated.

=== Transhumanism ===
It has also been suggested that only through substantial improvements and modifications could the human body endure the conditions of space travel. While not constrained by basic laws of nature in the way technical solutions are, this is far beyond current science of medicine.

=== Timing of missions ===
Due to the potential negative effects of astronaut exposure to cosmic rays, solar activity may play a role in future space travel. Because galactic cosmic ray fluxes within the Solar System are lower during periods of strong solar activity, interplanetary travel during solar maximum should minimize the average dose to astronauts.

Although the Forbush decrease effect during coronal mass ejections can temporarily lower the flux of galactic cosmic rays, the short duration of the effect (1–3 days) and the approximately 1% chance that a CME generates a dangerous solar proton event limits the utility of timing missions to coincide with CMEs.

=== Orbital selection ===
Radiation dosage from the Earth's radiation belts is typically mitigated by selecting orbits that avoid the belts or pass through them relatively quickly. For example a low Earth orbit, with low inclination, will generally be below the inner belt.

The orbits of the Earth-Moon system Lagrange points L_{2}–L_{5} take them out of the protection of the Earth's magnetosphere for approximately two-thirds of the time.

The orbits of Earth-Sun system Lagrange Points L_{1} and L_{3}–L_{5} are always outside the protection of the Earth's magnetosphere.

== Space radiobiology ==
Space radiobiology is the science that investigates the effects of space radiation in biological matter. This is an interdisciplinary field of research, aiming to create synergies between astroparticle and medical physics.

== Evidence sub-pages ==
The evidence and updates to projection models for cancer risk from low-LET radiation are reviewed periodically by several bodies, which include the following organizations:

- The NAS Committee on the Biological Effects of Ionizing Radiation
- The United Nations Scientific Committee on the Effects of Atomic Radiation (UNSCEAR)
- The ICRP
- The NCRP

These committees release new reports about every 10 years on cancer risks that are applicable to low-LET radiation exposures. Overall, the estimates of cancer risks among the different reports of these panels will agree within a factor of two or less. There is continued controversy for doses that are below 5 mSv, however, and for low dose-rate radiation because of debate over the linear no-threshold hypothesis that is often used in statistical analysis of these data. The BEIR VII report, which is the most recent of the major reports is used in the following sub-pages. Evidence for low-LET cancer effects must be augmented by information on protons, neutrons, and HZE nuclei that is only available in experimental models. Such data have been reviewed by NASA several times in the past and by the NCRP.

- Epidemiology data for low linear energy transfer radiation
- Radiobiology evidence for protons and HZE nuclei

== See also ==
- Central nervous system effects from radiation exposure during spaceflight
- Dosimetry
- Acute radiation syndrome
- Radiation protection
