= HZE ion =

High-energy, heavy ions of cosmic origin

HZE ions are the high-energy nuclei component of galactic cosmic rays (GCRs) that have an electric charge of +3 e or greater – that is, they must be the nuclei of elements that have an atomic number that is greater than that of helium.

The abbreviation "HZE" comes from high (H), atomic number (Z), and energy (E). HZE ions include the nuclei of all elements with atomic numbers greater than those of hydrogen (which has a +1 e charge) and helium (which has a +2 e charge). Each HZE ion consists of a nucleus with no orbiting electrons, meaning that the charge on the ion is the same as the atomic number of the nucleus. Their source is not certain, but is thought likely to be supernova explosions.

== Composition and abundance ==
HZE ions are rare compared to protons, for example, composing only 1% of GCRs versus 85% for protons. HZE ions, like other GCRs, travel near the speed of light.

In addition to the HZE ions from cosmic sources, HZE ions are produced by the Sun. During solar flares and other solar storms, HZE ions are sometimes produced in small amounts, along with the more typical protons, but their energy level is substantially smaller than that of HZE ions from cosmic rays.

Space radiation is composed mostly of high-energy protons, helium nuclei, and high-Z high-energy ions (HZE ions). The ionization patterns in molecules, cells, tissues, and the resulting biological harm are distinct from high-energy photon radiation: X-rays and gamma rays, which produce low-linear energy transfer (low-LET) radiation from secondary electrons.

While in space, astronauts are exposed to protons, helium nuclei, and HZE ions, as well as secondary radiation from nuclear reactions from spacecraft parts or tissue.

Prominent HZE ions
Carbon	C
Oxygen	O
Magnesium	Mg
Silicon	Si
Iron	Fe

GCRs typically originate from outside the Solar System and within the Milky Way galaxy, but those from outside of the Milky Way consist mostly of highly energetic protons with a small component of HZE ions. GCR energy spectra peaks, with median energy peaks up to 1000 MeV/Da, and nuclei (with energies up to 10000 MeV/Da) are important contributors to the dose equivalent.

== Health concerns of HZE ions ==
Although HZE ions make up a small proportion of cosmic rays, their high charge and high energies cause them to contribute significantly to the overall biological impact of cosmic rays, making them as significant as protons in regard to biological impact. The most dangerous GCRs are heavy ionized nuclei such as Fe^{26+}, an iron nucleus with a charge of +26 e. Such heavy particles are "much more energetic (millions of MeV) than typical protons accelerated by solar flares (tens to hundreds of MeV)". HZE ions can therefore penetrate through thick layers of shielding and body tissue, "breaking the strands of DNA molecules, damaging genes and killing cells".

For HZE ions that originate from solar particle events (SPEs), there is only a small contribution toward a person's absorbed dose of radiation. During a SPE, there is such a small amount of heavy ions generated that their effects are limited. Their energies per dalton are all significantly less than for protons found in the same SPE, meaning that protons are by far the largest contribution to astronaut body exposure during SPEs.

== See also ==
- High-energy nuclear physics
- Cosmic radiation
- Solar energetic particles
- Spaceflight radiation carcinogenesis
- Central nervous system effects from radiation exposure during spaceflight – HZE CNS health effects
- Swift heavy ion
- Ultra-high-energy cosmic ray – Cosmic-ray particle with a kinetic energy above 1 EeV
