= Linear energy transfer =

Measure for the energy lost by ions per traversed distance

Diffusion cloud chamber with tracks of ionizing radiation (alpha particles) that are made visible as strings of droplets

In dosimetry, linear energy transfer (LET) is the amount of energy that an ionizing particle transfers to the material traversed per unit distance. It describes the action of radiation into matter.

It is identical to the retarding force acting on a charged ionizing particle travelling through the matter. By definition, LET is a positive quantity. LET depends on the nature of the radiation as well as on the material traversed.

A high LET will slow down the radiation more quickly, generally making shielding more effective and preventing deep penetration. On the other hand, the higher concentration of deposited energy can cause more severe damage to any microscopic structures near the particle track. If a microscopic defect can cause larger-scale failure, as is the case in biological cells and microelectronics, the LET helps explain why radiation damage is sometimes disproportionate to the absorbed dose. Dosimetry attempts to factor in this effect with radiation weighting factors.

Linear energy transfer is closely related to stopping power, since both equal the retarding force. The unrestricted linear energy transfer is identical to linear electronic stopping power, as discussed below. But the stopping power and LET concepts are different in the respect that total stopping power has the nuclear stopping power component, and this component does not cause electronic excitations. Hence nuclear stopping power is not contained in LET.

The appropriate SI unit for LET is the newton, but it is most typically expressed in units of kiloelectronvolts per micrometre (keV/μm) or megaelectronvolts per centimetre (MeV/cm). While medical physicists and radiobiologists usually speak of linear energy transfer, most non-medical physicists talk about stopping power.

== Restricted and unrestricted LET ==
The secondary electrons produced during the process of ionization by the primary charged particle are conventionally called delta rays, if their energy is large enough so that they themselves can ionize. Many studies focus upon the energy transferred in the vicinity of the primary particle track and therefore exclude interactions that produce delta rays with energies larger than a certain value Δ. This energy limit is meant to exclude secondary electrons that carry energy far from the primary particle track, since a larger energy implies a larger range. This approximation neglects the directional distribution of secondary radiation and the non-linear path of delta rays, but simplifies analytic evaluation.

In mathematical terms, Restricted linear energy transfer is defined by

$$L_\Delta = \frac{\text{d}E_\Delta} {\text{d}x},$$

where $\text{d}E_\Delta$ is the energy loss of the charged particle due to electronic collisions while traversing a distance ${\text{d}x}$, excluding all secondary electrons with kinetic energies larger than Δ. If Δ tends toward infinity, then there are no electrons with larger energy, and the linear energy transfer becomes the unrestricted linear energy transfer which is identical to the linear electronic stopping power. Here, the use of the term "infinity" is not to be taken literally; it simply means that no energy transfers, however large, are excluded.

== Application to radiation types ==
During his investigations of radioactivity, Ernest Rutherford coined the terms alpha rays, beta rays and gamma rays for the three types of emissions that occur during radioactive decay.

=== Alpha particles and other positive ions ===
Bragg curve of 5.49 MeV alpha particles in air. This radiation is produced by the decay of radon (^{222}Rn); its range is 4.14 cm. Stopping power (which is essentially identical to LET) is plotted here versus path length; its peak is the "Bragg peak"

Linear energy transfer is best defined for monoenergetic ions, i.e. protons, alpha particles, and the heavier nuclei called HZE ions found in cosmic rays or produced by particle accelerators. These particles cause frequent direct ionizations within a narrow diameter around a relatively straight track, thus approximating continuous deceleration. As they slow down, the changing particle cross section modifies their LET, generally increasing it to a Bragg peak just before achieving thermal equilibrium with the absorber, i.e., before the end of range. At equilibrium, the incident particle essentially comes to rest or is absorbed, at which point LET is undefined.

Since the LET varies over the particle track, an average value is often used to represent the spread. Averages weighted by track length or weighted by absorbed dose are present in the literature, with the latter being more common in dosimetry. These averages are not widely separated for heavy particles with high LET, but the difference becomes more important in the other type of radiations discussed below.

Often overlooked for alpha particles is the recoil-nucleus of the alpha emitter, which has significant ionization energy of roughly 5% of the alpha particle, but because of its high electric charge and large mass, has an ultra-short range of only a few Angstroms. This can skew results significantly if one is examining the Relative Biological Effectiveness of the alpha particle in the cytoplasm, while ignoring the recoil nucleus contribution, which alpha-parent being one of numerous heavy metals, is typically adhered to chromatic material such as chromosomes.

=== Beta particles ===
Electrons produced in nuclear decay are called beta particles. Because of their low mass relative to atoms, they are strongly scattered by nuclei (Coulomb or Rutherford scattering), much more so than heavier particles. Beta particle tracks are therefore crooked. In addition to producing secondary electrons (delta rays) while ionizing atoms, they also produce bremsstrahlung photons. A maximum range of beta radiation can be defined experimentally which is smaller than the range that would be measured along the particle path.

=== Gamma rays ===
Gamma rays are photons, whose absorption cannot be described by LET. When a gamma quantum passes through matter, it may be absorbed in a single process (photoelectric effect, Compton effect or pair production), or it continues unchanged on its path. (Only in the case of the Compton effect, another gamma quantum of lower energy proceeds). Gamma ray absorption therefore obeys an exponential law (see Gamma rays); the absorption is described by the absorption coefficient or by the half-value thickness.

LET has therefore no meaning when applied to photons. However, many authors speak of "gamma LET" anyway, where they are actually referring to the LET of the secondary electrons, i.e., mainly Compton electrons, produced by the gamma radiation. The secondary electrons will ionize far more atoms than the primary photon. This gamma LET has little relation to the attenuation rate of the beam, but it may have some correlation to the microscopic defects produced in the absorber. Even a monoenergetic gamma beam will produce a spectrum of electrons, and each secondary electron will have a variable LET as it slows down, as discussed above. The "gamma LET" is therefore an average.

The transfer of energy from an uncharged primary particle to charged secondary particles can also be described by using the mass energy-transfer coefficient.

== Biological effects ==
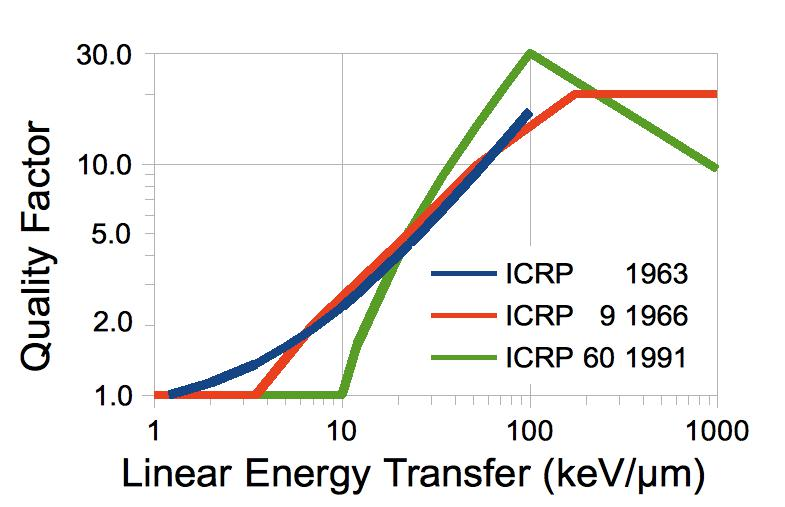
The ICRP used to recommend quality factors as a generalized approximation of RBE based on LET.

Many studies have attempted to relate linear energy transfer to the relative biological effectiveness (RBE) of radiation, with inconsistent results. The relationship varies widely depending on the nature of the biological material, and the choice of endpoint to define effectiveness. Even when these are held constant, different radiation spectra that shared the same LET have significantly different RBE.

Despite these variations, some overall trends are commonly seen. The RBE is generally independent of LET for any LET less than 10 keV/μm, so a low LET is normally chosen as the reference condition where RBE is set to unity. Above 10 keV/μm, some systems show a decline in RBE with increasing LET, while others show an initial increase to a peak before declining. Mammalian cells usually experience a peak RBE for LET's around 100 keV/μm. These are very rough numbers; for example, one set of experiments found a peak at 30 keV/μm.

The International Commission on Radiation Protection (ICRP) proposed a simplified model of RBE-LET relationships for use in dosimetry. They defined a quality factor of radiation as a function of dose-averaged unrestricted LET in water, and intended it as a highly uncertain, but generally conservative, approximation of RBE. Different iterations of their model are shown in the graph to the right. The 1966 model was integrated into their 1977 recommendations for radiation protection in ICRP 26. This model was largely replaced in the 1991 recommendations of ICRP 60 by radiation weighting factors that were tied to the particle type and independent of LET. ICRP 60 revised the quality factor function and reserved it for use with unusual radiation types that did not have radiation weighting factors assigned to them.

== Application fields ==
When used to describe the dosimetry of ionizing radiation in the biological or biomedical setting, the LET (like linear stopping power) is usually expressed in units of keV/μm.

In space applications, electronic devices can be disturbed by the passage of energetic electrons, protons or heavier ions that may alter the state of a circuit, producing "single event effects". The effect of the radiation is described by the LET (which is here taken as synonymous with stopping power), typically expressed in units of MeV·cm^{2}/mg of material, the units used for mass stopping power (the material in question is usually Si for MOS devices). The units of measurement arise from a combination of the energy lost by the particle to the material per unit path length (MeV/cm) divided by the density of the material (mg/cm^{3}).

"Soft errors" of electronic devices due to cosmic rays on earth are, however, mostly due to neutrons which do not directly interact with the material and whose passage can therefore not be described by LET. Rather, one measures their effect in terms of neutrons per cm^{2} per hour, see Soft error.
