= Secondary electrons =

Electrons generated as ionization products

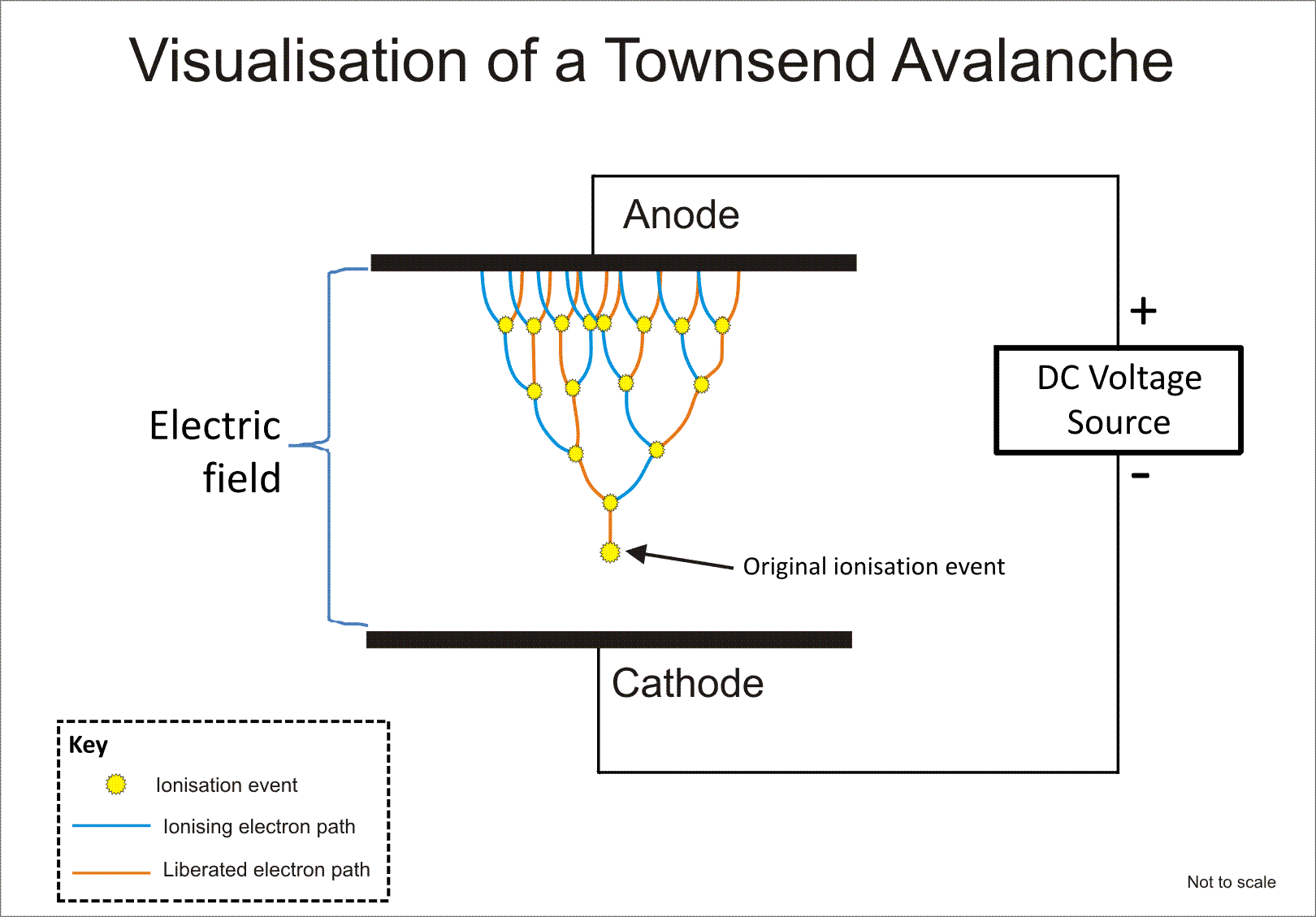
Visualisation of a Townsend avalanche, which is sustained by the generation of secondary electrons in an electric field

Secondary electrons are electrons generated as ionization products. They are called 'secondary' because they are generated by other radiation (the primary radiation). This radiation can be in the form of ions, electrons, or photons with sufficiently high energy, i.e. exceeding the ionization potential. Photoelectrons can be considered an example of secondary electrons where the primary radiation are photons; in some discussions photoelectrons with higher energy (>50 eV) are still considered "primary" while the electrons freed by the photoelectrons are "secondary".

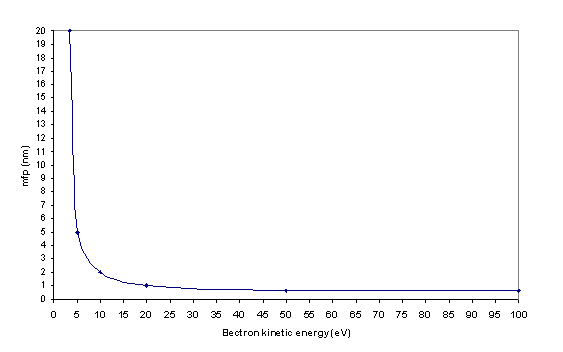
Mean free path of low-energy electrons. Secondary electrons are generally considered to have energies below 50 eV. The rate of energy loss for electron scattering is very low, so most electrons released have energies peaking below 5 eV(Seiler, 1983).

== Applications ==
Secondary electrons are also the main means of viewing images in the scanning electron microscope (SEM). The range of secondary electrons depends on the energy. Plotting the inelastic mean free path as a function of energy often shows characteristics of the "universal curve" familiar to electron spectroscopists and surface analysts. This distance is on the order of a few nanometers in metals and tens of nanometers in insulators. This small distance allows such fine resolution to be achieved in the SEM.

For SiO_{2}, for a primary electron energy of 100 eV, the secondary electron range is up to 20 nm from the point of incidence.

== See also ==
- Delta ray
- Everhart–Thornley detector
