= Delta ray =

Type of radiation

A delta ray is a secondary electron with enough energy to escape a significant distance away from the primary radiation beam and produce further ionization. The term is sometimes used to describe any recoil particle caused by secondary ionization. The term was coined by J. J. Thomson.

== Characteristics ==
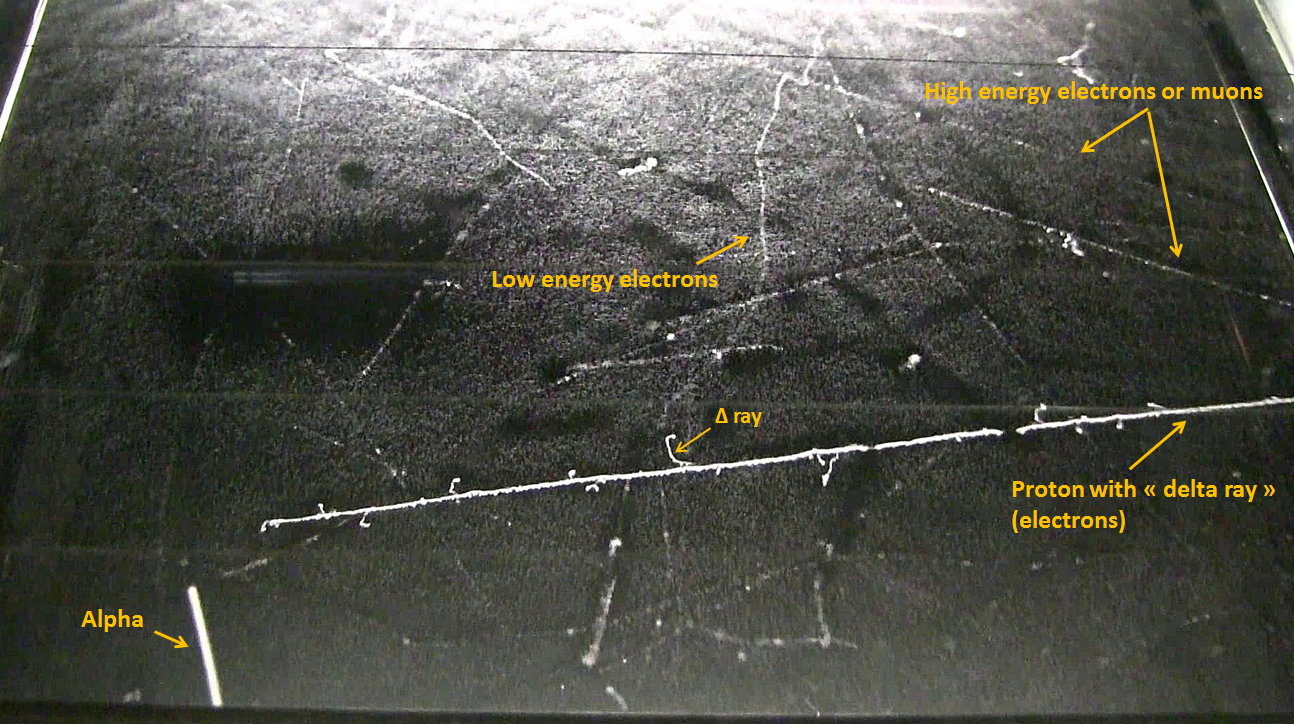
Fig. 1: Image taken in the Pic du Midi at 2877 m in a Phywe PJ45 cloud chamber (size of surface is 45 x 45 cm). This picture shows the four particles that are detectable in a cloud chamber : proton, electron, muon (probably) and alpha. Delta rays are seen associated with the proton track.

A delta ray is characterized by very fast electrons produced in quantity by alpha particles or other fast energetic charged particles knocking bound electrons out of atoms. Collectively, these electrons are defined as delta radiation when they have sufficient energy to ionize further atoms through subsequent interactions on their own. Delta rays appear as branches in the main track of a cloud chamber (See Figs. 1,2). These branches will appear nearer the start of the track of a heavy charged particle, where more energy is imparted to the ionized electrons.

== Delta rays in particle accelerators ==
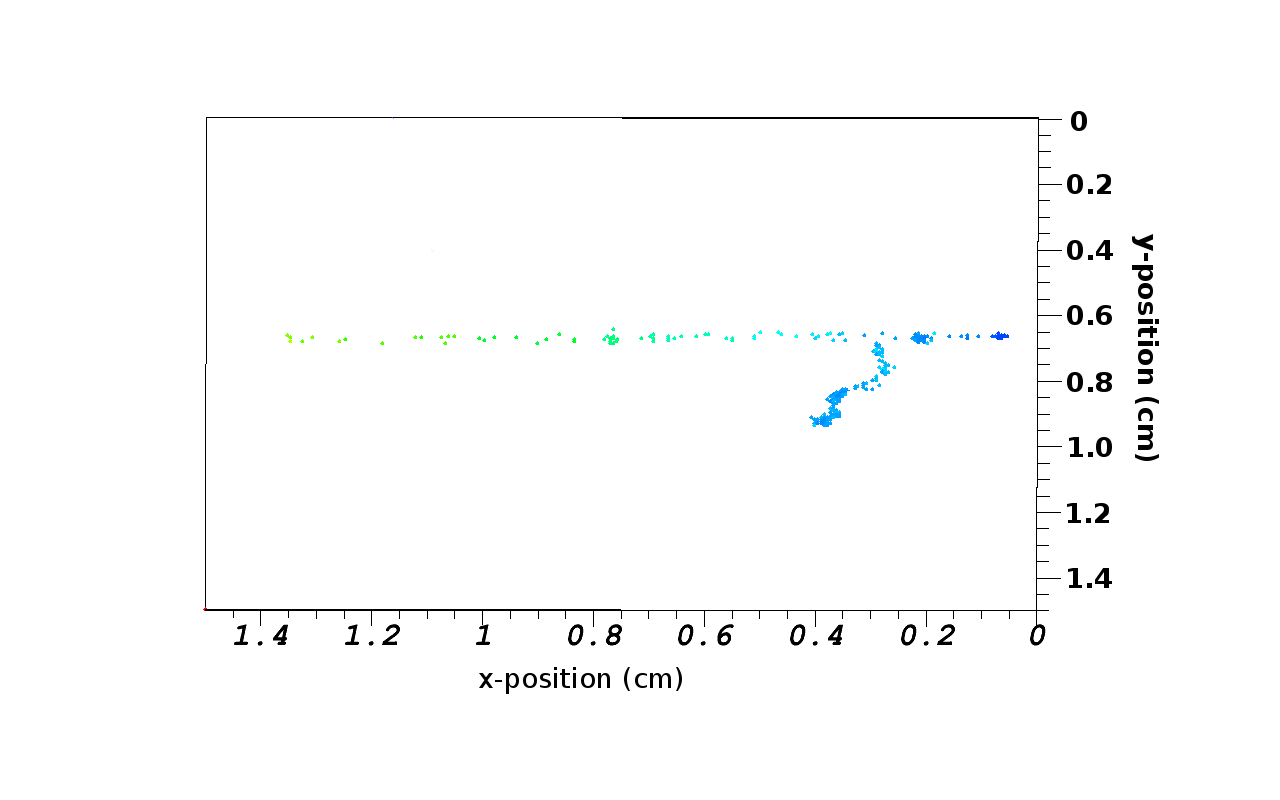
Fig. 2: A 3D representation of a delta electron knocked out by a 180 GeV muon, measured with a GridPix detector at the SPS at CERN. The colour indicates the height

Otherwise called a knock-on electron, the term "delta ray" is also used in high energy physics to describe single electrons in particle accelerators that are exhibiting characteristic deceleration. In a bubble chamber, electrons will lose their energy more quickly than other particles through Bremsstrahlung and will create a spiral track due to their small mass and the magnetic field. The Bremsstrahlung rate is proportional to the square of the acceleration of the electron.

== Epsilon ray ==
An Epsilon ray or Epsilon radiation is a type of tertiary radiation. Epsilon rays are a form of particle radiation and are composed of electrons. The term was coined by J. J. Thomson, but is very rarely used nowadays.

== See also ==
- List of particles
- Particle physics
- Radioactivity
- Radiation
- Rays:
  - α (alpha) rays
  - β (beta) rays
  - X-ray
  - γ (gamma) rays
