= Flight Time =

Flight Time may refer to:

- Flight time, the duration of an aircraft flight
- Herbert "Flight Time" Lang, basketball player
- FlightTime Radio, aviation orientated radio station
- Flight-time equivalent dose
- Flight Time (3rd Reconnaissance Battalion), killed in action during the Vietnam War
