= Reasoner (disambiguation) =

A reasoner is a piece of software able to infer logical consequences from a set of asserted facts or axioms.

Reasoner may also refer to:

- 20474 Reasoner, a main-belt asteroid
- New Reasoner, a political magazine
- Reasoners Run, a stream in Ohio, U.S.
- Solver, software that solves a family of mathematical problems by inferring consequences from logical rules
- USS Reasoner (FF-1063), a Knox class frigate

== People with the surname ==
- Elsie Reasoner Ralph (1878–1913), first American female war correspondent
- Frank S. Reasoner (1937–1965), United States Marine Corps officer
- Harry Reasoner (1923–1991), American journalist
- James Reasoner (born 1953), American novelist
- Marty Reasoner (born 1977), American ice hockey player
- Mike Reasoner (born 1960), American politician
- Stephen M. Reasoner (1944–2004), American judge
- Tommy Reasoner (born 1967), American soccer player
