= Terrence Graves =

Terrence Graves may refer to:

- Terrence C. Graves, United States Marine Corps officer and Medal of Honor recipient
- Terrence Graves (American football), American college football coach
