= Flight-time equivalent dose =

Dose measurement of radiation

Flight-time equivalent dose (FED) is an informal unit of measurement of ionizing radiation exposure. Expressed in units of flight-time (i.e., flight-seconds, flight-minutes, flight-hours), one unit of flight-time is approximately equivalent to the radiological dose received during the same unit of time spent in an airliner at cruising altitude. FED is intended as a general educational unit to enable a better understanding of radiological dose by converting dose typically presented in sieverts into units of time. FED is only meant as an educational exercise and is not a formally adopted dose measurement.

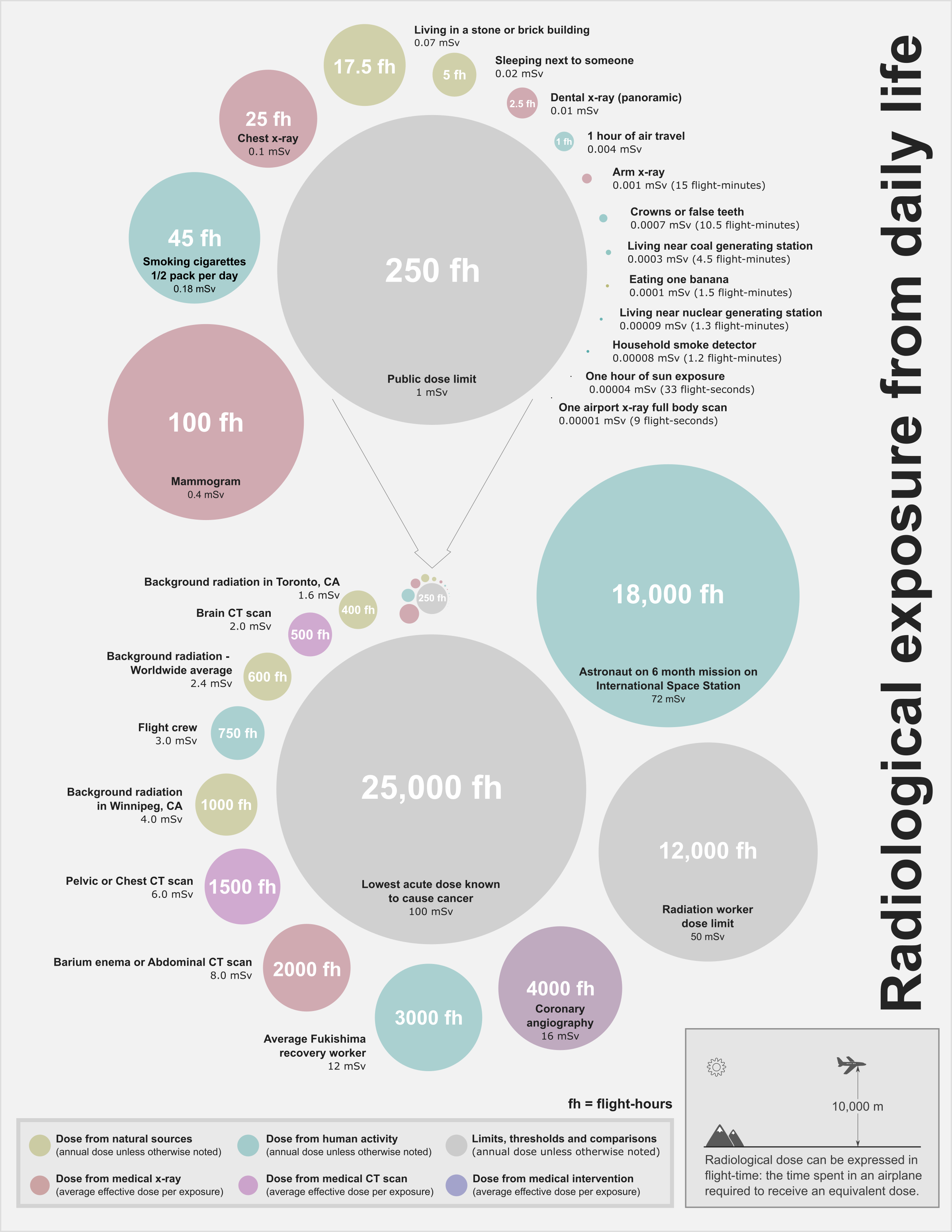
Visual comparison of radiological exposure from daily life activities.

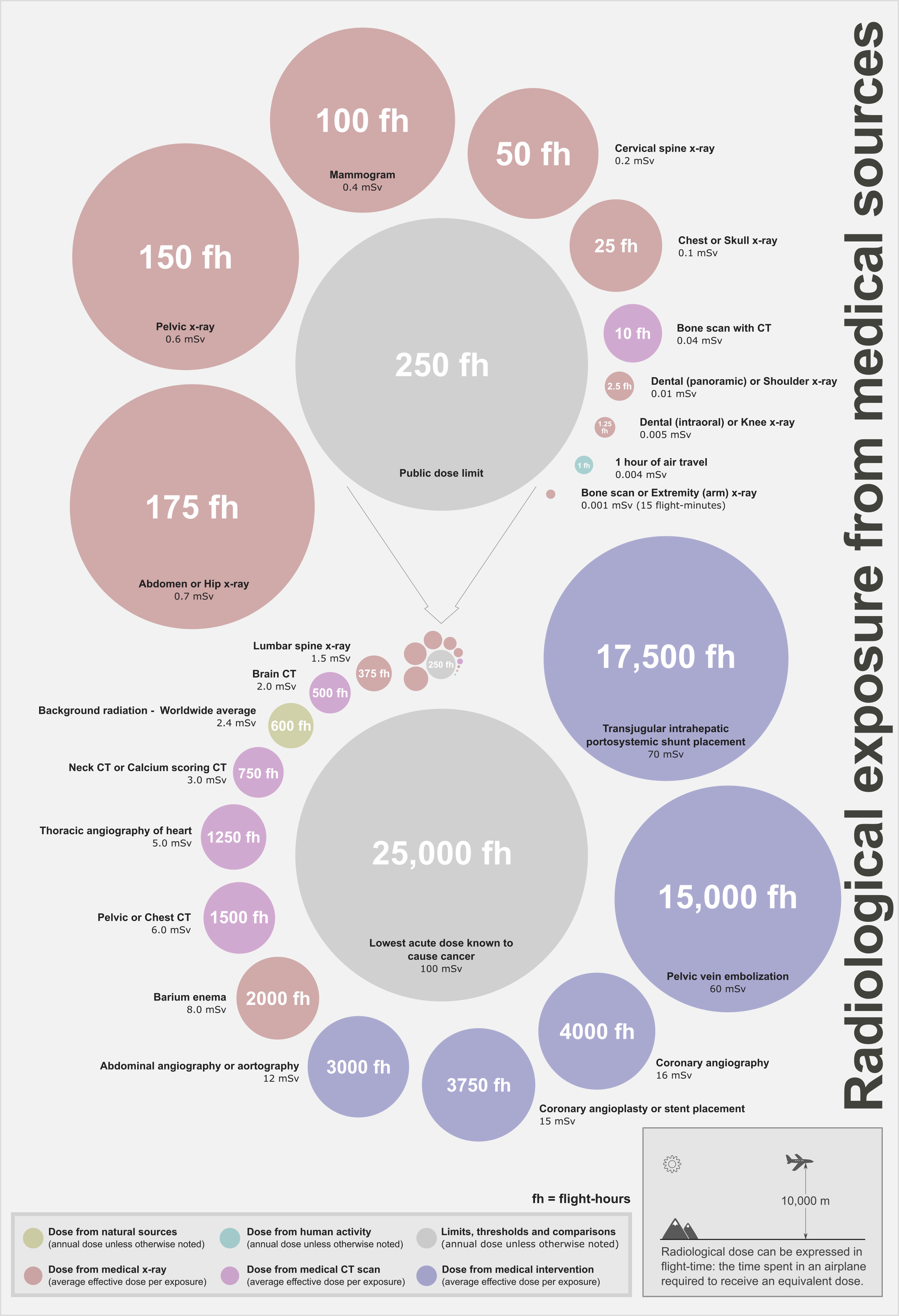
Visual comparison of radiological exposure from medical sources.

== History ==
The flight-time equivalent dose concept is the creation of Ulf Stahmer, a Canadian professional engineer working in the field of radioactive materials transport. It was first presented in the poster session at the 18th International Symposium of the Packaging and Transport of Radioactive Materials (PATRAM) held in Kobe, Hyogo, Japan where the poster received an Aoki Award for distinguished poster presentation. In 2018, an article on FED appeared in the peer-reviewed journal The Physics Teacher.

== Usage ==
Flight-time equivalent dose is an informal measurement, so any equivalences are necessarily approximate. It has been found useful to provide context between radiological doses received from various every-day activities and medical procedures.

== Dose calculation ==
FED corresponds to the time spent in an airliner flying at altitude required to receive a corresponding radiological dose. FED is calculated by taking a known dose (typically in millisieverts) and dividing it by the average dose rate (typically in millisieverts per hour) at an altitude of 10,000 m, a typical cruising altitude for a commercial airliner.

$$FED=  \frac{{mSv}_{dose}}{{0.004 \frac{mSv}{h}}_{cruising altitude}}$$

While radiological dose at cruising altitudes varies with latitude, for FED calculations, the radiological dose rate at an altitude of 10,000 m has been standardized to be 0.004 mSv/h, about 15 times greater than the average dose rate at the Earth's surface. Using this technique, the FED received from a 0.01 mSv panoramic dental x-ray is approximately equivalent to 2.5 flight-hours; the FED received from eating one banana is approximately equal to 1.5 flight-minutes; and the FED received each year from naturally occurring background radiation (2.4 mSv/year) is approximately equivalent to 600 flight-hours.

== Radiological exposures and limits ==
For comparison, a list of activities (including common medical procedures) and their estimated radiological exposures are tabulated below. Regulatory occupational dose limits for the public and radiation workers are also included. Items on this list are represented pictorially in the accompanying illustrations.

List of radiological exposures from various sources
Activity	Event Type	Dose	FED
Airport backscatter x-ray full body scan	singular	0.00001 mSv	9 flight-seconds
One hour of sun exposure	singular	0.00004 mSv	36 flight-seconds
Household smoke detector	annual	0.00008 mSv	1.2 flight-minutes
Living near a nuclear generating station	annual	0.00009 mSv	1.3 flight-minutes
Eating one banana	singular	0.0001 mSv	1.5 flight-minutes
Living near a coal generating station	annual	0.0003 mSv	4.5 flight-minutes
Crowns or false teeth	annual	0.0007 mSv	10.5 flight-minutes
Bone scan or extremity (arm) x-ray	singular	0.001 mSv	15 flight-minutes
One hour of air travel	singular	0.004 mSv	1 flight-hour
Dental (intraoral) or knee x-ray	singular	0.005 mSv	1.2 flight-hours
Dental (panoramic) or shoulder x-ray	singular	0.01 mSv	2.5 flight-hours
Sleeping next to someone	annual	0.02 mSv	5 flight-hours
Bone scan with CT	singular	0.04 mSv	10 flight-hours
Living in a stone or brick building	annual	0.07 mSv	17.5 flight-hours
Chest or skull x-ray	singular	0.1 mSv	25 flight-hours
Smoking cigarettes (1 cigarette per day)	annual	0.018 mSv	4.5 flight-hours
Cervical spine x-ray	singular	0.2 mSv	50 flight-hours
Mammogram	singular	0.4 mSv	100 flight-hours
Pelvic x-ray	singular	0.6 mSv	150 flight-hours
Abdomen or hip x-ray	singular	0.7 mSv	175 flight-hours
Public dose limit	limit	1 mSv	250 flight-hours
Lumbar spine x-ray	singular	1.5 mSv	375 flight-hours
Background radiation in Toronto, CA	annual	1.6 mSv	400 flight-hours
Brain CT scan	singular	2 mSv	500 flight-hours
Background radiation - worldwide average	annual	2.4 mSv	600 flight-hours
Flight crew	annual	3 mSv	750 flight-hours
Neck CT or calcium scoring CT	singular	3 mSv	750 flight-hours
Background radiation in Winnipeg, CA	annual	4 mSv	1000 flight-hours
Thoracic angiography of heart	singular	5 mSv	1250 flight-hours
Pelvic or chest CT scan	singular	6 mSv	1500 flight-hours
Barium enema	singular	8 mSv	2000 flight-hours
Average Fukishima recovery worker	singular	12 mSv	3000 flight-hours
Abdominal angiography or aortography	singular	12 mSv	3000 flight-hours
Coronary angioplasty or stent placement	singular	15 mSv	3750 flight-hours
Coronary angiography	singular	16 mSv	4000 flight-hours
Average annual radiation worker dose limit	limit	20 mSv	5000 flight-hours
Maximum annual radiation worker dose limit	limit	50 mSv	12,500 flight-hours
Pelvic vein embolization	singular	60 mSv	15,000 flight-hours
Transjugular intrahepatic portosystemic shunt placement	singular	70 mSv	17,500 flight-hours
Astronaut on 6 month ISS mission	singular	72 mSv	18,000 flight-hours
Lowest acute dose known to cause cancer	singular	100 mSv	25,000 flight-hours

== See also ==
- Background radiation
- Background radiation equivalent time
- Banana equivalent dose
- List of unusual units of measurement
