= Background radiation equivalent time =

Background radiation equivalent time (BRET) or background equivalent radiation time (BERT) is a unit of measurement of ionizing radiation dosage amounting to one day worth of average human exposure to background radiation.

BRET units are used as a measure of low level radiation exposure. The health hazards of low doses of ionizing radiation are unknown and controversial, because the effects, mainly cancer and genetic damage, take many years to appear, and the incidence due to radiation exposure can't be statistically separated from the many other causes of these diseases. The purpose of the BRET measure is to allow a low level dose to be easily compared with a universal yardstick: the average dose of background radiation, mostly from natural sources, that every human unavoidably receives during daily life. Background radiation level is widely used in radiological health fields as a standard for setting exposure limits. Presumably, a dose of radiation which is equivalent to what a person would receive in a few days of ordinary life will not increase their rate of disease measurably.

== Definition ==
The BRET is the creation of Professor J R Cameron. The BRET value corresponding to a dose of radiation is the number of days of average natural background dose it is equivalent to. It is calculated from the equivalent dose in sieverts by dividing by the average annual background radiation dose in Sv, and multiplying by 365:

$$BRET = \frac{{SV}_{dose}}{{SV}_{background}} \cdot 365 \,$$

The definition of the BRET unit is apparently unstandardized, and depends on what value is used for the average annual background radiation dose, which varies greatly across time and location. The 2000 UNSCEAR estimate for worldwide average natural background radiation dose is 2.4 mSv (240 mrem), with a range from 1 to 13 mSv. A small area in India as high as 30 mSv (3 rem). Using the 2.4 mSv value each BRET unit equals 6.6 μSv.

BRET values for diagnostic radiography procedures range from 2 BRET for a dental x-ray to around 400 for a barium enema study.

== See also ==
- Background radiation
- Banana equivalent dose
- Flight-time equivalent dose
- Radiology
