= 3rd Reconnaissance Battalion =

- 3rd Reconnaissance Battalion insignia "Swift – Silent – Deadly"
- Active: 16 September 1942 – present
- Country: United States of America
- Branch: United States Marine Corps
- Type: Marine Division Recon
- Part of: III Marine Expeditionary Force; 3rd Marine Division
- Garrison/HQ: Camp Schwab (satellite of Camp S.D. Butler), Okinawa
- Engagements: World War II: Battle of Bougainville; Solomon Islands; Battle of Guam; Battle of Iwo Jima; Vietnam War; Operation Desert Storm; War on terror: Iraq War; Operation Enduring Freedom

The 3rd Reconnaissance Battalion (3rd Recon) conducts amphibious and ground reconnaissance in support of the 3rd Marine Division and Marine Forces Pacific (MarForPac), operating in the commander's areas of influence. The battalion is based out of Camp Schwab, a satellite base of Marine Corps Base Camp Smedley D. Butler. It is geographically located on the Okinawa Prefecture in Japan.

== Organization ==
The 3rd Recon Battalion consists of approximately 450 Marines and Fleet Marine Force sailors that falls under the command of the 3rd Marine Division, III Marine Expeditionary Force.

Company B was formed from the 5th Force Reconnaissance Company due to the formation of the Marine Special Operations Teams (MSOT) in 2006.

3rd Recon Battalion supports the 31st Marine Expeditionary Unit by augmenting a Reconnaissance and Surveillance (R&S) Platoon.

=== Chronology ===
- The 3rd Reconnaissance Company was activated on 16 September 1942 at Marine Corps Base Camp Pendleton, California as the Company E (Scouts), 3rd Tank Battalion, and assigned to the 3rd Marine Division.
- On 20 April 1943, they were redesignated as 3rd Scout Company, Headquarters Battalion, 3rd Marine Division.
- On 1 July 1943, they were redesignated as Company D (Scout), 3rd Tank Battalion.
- On 1 April 1944, they were redesignated Division Reconnaissance Company, Headquarters Battalion, 3rd Marine Division.
- Reactivated on 1 March 1952 at Camp Pendleton, they were designated as Reconnaissance Company, Headquarters Battalion and assigned to the 3rd Marine Division, Fleet Marine Force.
- In August 1953, they deployed to Camp McGill, Japan; and subsequently redeployed in April 1956 to Camp Hauge, Okinawa.
- They were deactivated on 14 April 1958 and reactivated the following day, 15 April 1958, at Camp Schwab, Okinawa, as the 3rd Reconnaissance Battalion, 3rd Marine Division.
- 3rd Recon Battalion deployed to various locations in the Western Pacific until its stand down and deactivation in 1992.
- After de-activation, 3rd Recon Battalion companies devolved to three Regiments in 3rd Marine Division: A Company- Recon Company, 3rd Marine Regiment, B Company – Recon Company, 9th Marine Regiment, and D Company – Recon Company, 4th Marine Regiment. C Company personnel were folded into B and D companies prior to disbandment.
- In January 1994, Recon companies, 4th Marine Regiment and 9th Marine Regiment merged to form Recon Company, Headquarters Battalion, 3rd Marine Division at Camp Schwab, Okinawa. Recon Company, 3rd Marine Regiment remained at the Regimental level.
- On 2 June 2000, 3rd Reconnaissance Battalion was again reactivated by combining the force and company reconnaissance elements.

== History ==
To become a recon Marine requires the toughest mental and physical fortitude. This video demonstrates some of the challenges faced by these Marines.

=== World War II ===
In January–February 1943, they deployed to Auckland, New Zealand.

During the recapture of Guam, the 3rd Marine Division and the 1st Provisional Marine Brigade each had its own reconnaissance company. Major General Lemuel C. Shepherd split the 3rd Division's scout and sniper company into its three platoons to attach each to the brigade's regiments, the 4th and 22nd. The 22nd Marine Regiment's commander, Colonel Merlin F. Schneider, kept his regiment's assigned recon platoon close to the command post (CP). They were used to for rapid deployment on recon missions for the regimental commander, or when not being used on a specific mission, they guarded the CP. Colonel Schneider retired with the rank of brigadier general after receiving the Navy Cross and Bronze Star.

At night, a landing was made on W-Day, General Shepherd and each of his regimental commanders waited for the usual nightly Japanese counterattacks. The Japanese forces was led by Japanese Colonel Tsunetaro Suenaga of the 38th Regiment from the Imperial Japanese Army's 29th Division. At 2130, Colonel Suenaga probed his attacks at the juncture of the regimental boundaries between the 3rd Marine Division's 4th Marines and the Marine Brigade's 22nd Marines. The enemy charged in force and overran the forward Marine lines and began to penetrate the thinly held rear areas. Using grenades, small arms, mortars, bayonet and close quarters combat, they were able to hold of the attacking Japanese army.

However, one Japanese element during their counterattack managed to reach the 75 mm pack howitzer artillery position before they were ultimately stopped by the gun crews. A Japanese company of infiltrators approached the regimental command post. At this point, the Marine defenders, all hands—clerks, cooks, and supernumeries, rallied around 1st Lt. Dennis Chavez, Jr. recon platoon. They too immediately stopped the Japanese attack. By dawn, the Japanese 28th Infantry Regiment was eliminated. Colonel Suenaga was wounded and later killed in these attacks.

Within the 1st Marine Prov. Brigade, on the night of 25–26 July 1944, Colonel Craig, the commanding officer of 9th Marines and the adjoining 21st Marines were concerned about the front line that was left open. Craig opted to use his regimental scout platoon to help fill the gap between the regiments. At about 2330, a forward operating post reported increased activity. By midnight, artillery and mortar fire bombarded the area starting another major counterattack by the Japanese. As a consequence, the lightly armed scout platoon was forced to fall back.

The last reconnaissance on Guam was conducted by a mechanized reconnaissance-in-force. A force consisted of Alpha, Echo (Scouts), and H&S Company of 3rd Tank Battalion; and I Company of 21st Marines. During the last major actions beginning 3 August 1944, the 1st Battalion, 9th Marines (1/9) had secured a series of roads that junctioned in Finegayan Village, in the northern section of the islands. Lieutenant Colonel Hartnoll J. Withers led the group, moving north-northwest. Two M3 Half-track, two jeeps for communications purposes and one platoon of tanks supported by an infantry platoon were maneuvering toward Road Junction 177.

Their column was immediately hit by heavy concentrated fire from 75-mm and 105-m artillery, tanks, mortars and heavy small-arms and machine guns. The Marines returned fire and after two hours, the Marines managed to destroy two of the 75 mm guns, one Japanese tank, and several machine-gun nests. Recognizing the Japanese held the advantage in terrain and cover, the Marines withdrew their forces back. Later it was determined that the attack was against a full Japanese battalion of Rikusentai, the elite Special Naval Landing Force. Guam was finally declared secured on 10 August 1944, after an intense three-week battle.

In December 1945, they returned to Camp Pendleton, and were deactivated on 31 December 1945.

=== Vietnam War ===
The first U.S. combat units that landed during the Vietnam War were Marine units. On 8 March 1965 the 9th Marine Expeditionary Brigade landed at Red Beach, Da Nang to secure Da Nang Air Base and establish an effective beachhead. Within the original landing force, a platoon from Company A, 3rd Reconnaissance Battalion attached to Battalion Landing Team 3rd Battalion, 9th Marines became the first division reconnaissance element to be "resident" in South Vietnam.

The Marines made their encounter with a small company of Viet Cong on 22 April 1965. A recon patrol from D Company, 3rd Reconnaissance Battalion was scouting 13 kilometers southwest of Da Nang. The Marine patrol was accompanied by a few platoons from the Army of the Republic of Vietnam (ARVN). After a brief intense exchange of small-arms fire, the outnumbered recon Marines radioed in for support. An infantry company from Battalion Landing Team 1st Battalion, 3rd Marines (BLT 1/3) reinforced the small group of D Company and the ARVN. The combined force was able to push the hostile force back several kilometers before losing them in the heavily foliaged terrain. Two days later on 24 April, a recon squad positioned two kilometers south of Da Nang fell under a surprise attack by VC as the Marines were setting up defensive positions for the night. Although the firefight lasted for only a few minutes, each side lost two men.

The beachhead was secured a couple of weeks later. In the later afternoon of 7 May 1965, elements of the 3rd Reconnassaisnce Battalion arrived at Chu Lai from Da Nang and secured the beachhead's southern flank as BLT 1/4 was setting up several kilometers inland. A few days later, BLT 3/3 arrived from Okinawa, and 3rd Recon Battalion returned to Da Nang.

Actions that summer led to a Marine, 1st Lt. Frank S. Reasoner, becoming the first Marine of the war to receive the Medal of Honor. On 12 July 1965, an 18-man patrol from A Company, 3rd Reconnaissance Battalion led by Reasoner was under fire about 20 kilometers southwest of Da Nang Air Base. Reasoner's patrol was under a barrage of heavy fire. His radio operator was hit by enemy fire. Reasoner came to the operator's aid as he provided cover, killing two VC and interrupting hostile automatic weapons fire. As Reasoner was about to render hasty first aid to his radioman, he was mortally wounded.

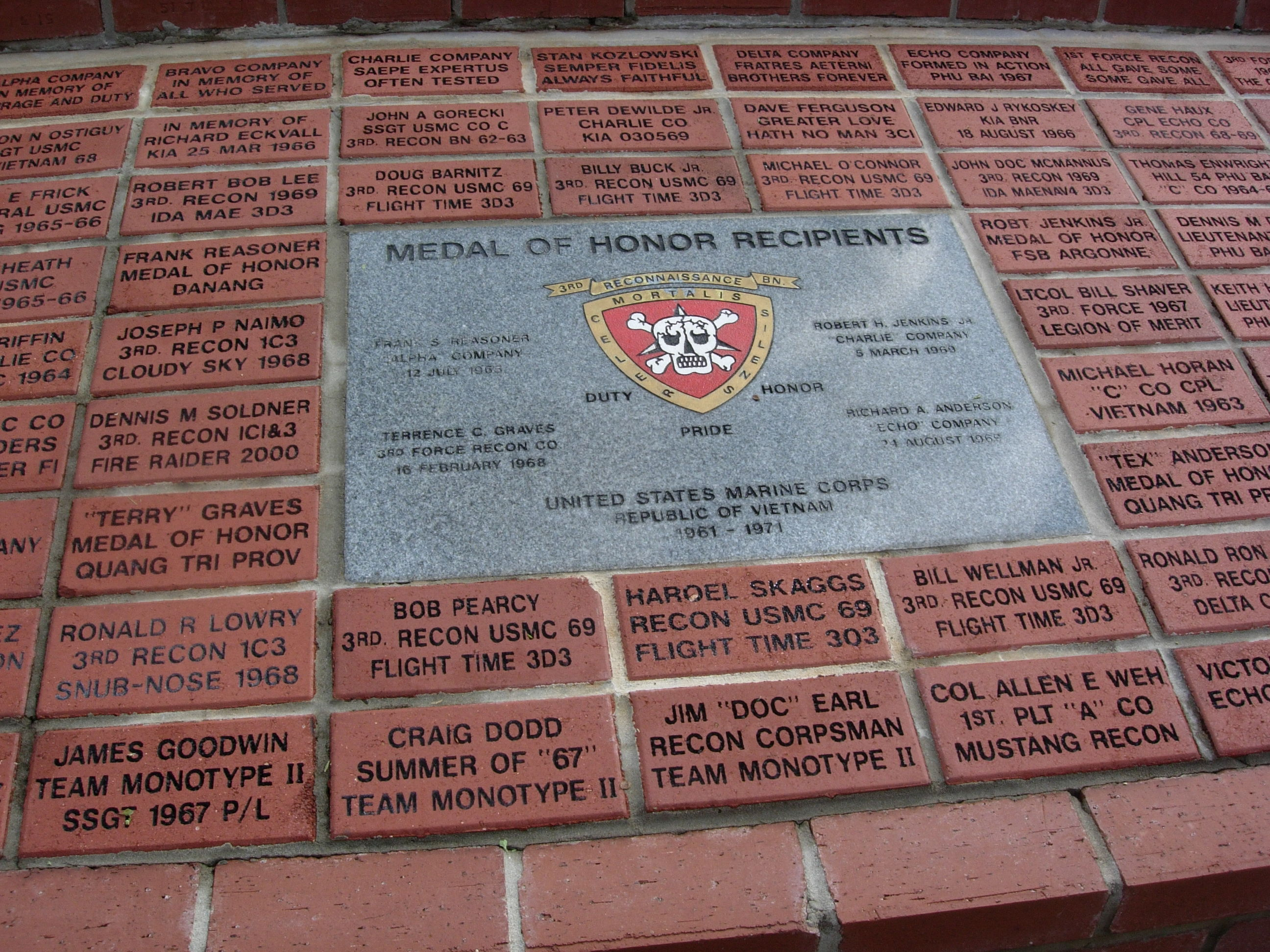
USMC 3rd Reconnaissance Battalion memorial, center marble stone is for Medal of Honor recipients, red bricks above and below: team "Flight Time" Ocala, Florida

On 4 June 1969, the 3rd Reconnaissance Battalion lost an entire 6 man recon team, call sign "Flight Time". No other full team was lost during the remaining six years of the Vietnam War. The team's "Last Known Activity" report reads:

2 June 1969 Recon Team "Flight Time" from D Company, 3rd Recon Battalion, was inserted on Hill 471 about a kilometer south of Khe Sanh in the Quảng Trị Province, Vietnam. On the night of 3/4 June 1969 the team was attacked by an enemy force and requested both emergency extraction and immediate reinforcement. Communications with the team were lost at 0320. When the reactionary force arrived a little after 0400 they were too late ... the six members of '"Flight Time" were killed in action. Five members of the team were in a small trench; the sixth, was approximately 10 meters further down the hillside. It was apparent from the state of the battle area that "Flight Time" had been overwhelmed in fierce hand-to-hand combat.

Team members were 1st Lt. Michael M. O'Connor, Cpl. William A. Buck Jr., Cpl. William M. Wellman Jr., LCpl. Douglas W. Barnitz, Pfc. Robert L. Pearcy and Pfc. Harold A. Skaggs.

The last elements of the battalion left South Vietnam on 20 November 1969 as part of Operation Keystone Cardinal.

=== 1974–present ===
Restructuring of 1st and 3rd reconnaissance Battalions:

1. CMC message 151921Z Jul 74 approved the cadre of 1st Force Reconnaissance Company to zero strength during FY-75

2. MCBUL 5400 Dated 29 Mar 75 directed the restructuring of Company A, 1st Reconnaissance Battalion and Company B, 3rd Reconnaissance Battalion, replacing one platoon with a deep reconnaissance platoon. The total authorized strength of the deep reconnaissance platoon will be the same as the Battalion Reconnaissance Platoon it replaces, i. e., 1 officer and 23 enlisted.

It also revised the mission statement of the 1st and 3rd reconnaissance Battalion to read as follows: "Conduct ground reconnaissance operation in support of the Marine Division and its subordinate elements and maintain a minimum capability of one combat ready platoon organized, trained and equipped for the conduct of deep reconnaissance operations in support of the landing force."

"The deep reconnaissance platoon will have a platoon headquarters and three 4-man deep reconnaissance teams. The scuba and parachute capabilities will be retained in the new platoon. Additionally, the H&S companies will be authorized 23 USMC and 2 USN jump billets for personnel/assigned to the deep reconnaissance platoon."

3rd Recon Bn was located for a time at Camp Onna Point, circa 1974–1980 in the town of Onna, Okinawa Prefecture, Japan at a former US facility on the Onna peninsula before being relocated to Camp Schwab. The area has been leveled and no longer occupied by USFJ personnel.

Post-Vietnam War, 3rd Reconnaissance Battalion was divided up between 3rd Marine Division on Okinawa and 1st Marine Brigade in Hawai'i. Company A 3rd Reconnaissance Battalion was attached to the 3rd Marine Regiment, MCAS Kaneohe Bay, Hawai'i. Headquarters and Service Company, and B, C, and D Companies, 3rd Reconnaissance Battalion were assigned to the 3rd Marine Division on Okinawa.

"2nd Force Reconnaissance Company and the USMCR Force Reconnaissance Company will remain intact with original pre-assault and deep post-assault missions."

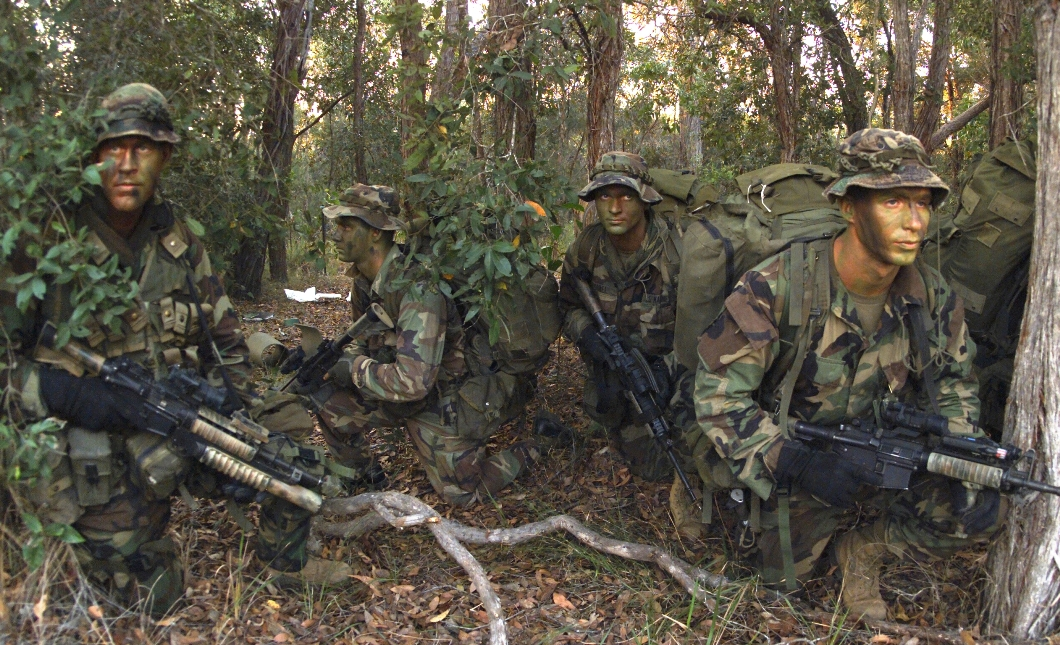
Marines from Deep Reconnaissance Platoon, Bravo Company, wait for the word to begin an exercise during Crocodile 2003.

The 3rd Reconnaissance Battalion served in the Gulf War including being involved in the Battle of Khafji. In March 2004, elements of B Company, 3rd Reconnaissance Battalion deployed to the Persian Gulf in support of Operation Iraqi Freedom. On 13 February 2005, 3rd Reconnaissance Battalion deployed to Iraq to conduct combat operations in the Al Anbar Province, and was the focus of the documentary film Alpha Company: Iraq Diary. From September 2006 to April 2007, 3rd Reconnaissance Battalion deployed to Iraq to conduct combat operations in the Al Anbar Province. From April to November 2008, 3rd Reconnaissance Battalion deployed to Iraq to conduct combat operations in Al Anbar Province for its third combat tour. In November 2009, elements of the battalion deployed in support Operation Enduring Freedom in Afghanistan. In May 2011, the battalion deployed again to Afghanistan, this time to the Sangin District of Helmand Province. They conducted a Relief-In-Place (RIP) with 2nd Reconnaissance Battalion, taking over Patrol Base (PB) Alcatraz and began conducting operations in early June, returning home to Okinawa in December 2011.

== Medal of Honor recipients ==
Medal of Honor recipients

- 1st Lt. Frank S. Reasoner – Vietnam War, 12 July 1965 (KIA)
- 2nd Lt. Terrence C. Graves – Vietnam War, 16 February 1968 (KIA)
- Pfc. Robert H. Jenkins, Jr. – Vietnam War, 5 March 1969 (KIA)
- LCpl. Richard A. Anderson – Vietnam War, 24 August 1969 (KIA)

== Navy Cross recipients ==
Navy Cross recipients

- Sgt. James N. Tycz (KIA), Cpl. Bryant C. Collins, Cpl. Roger D. See, LCpl. Manuel A. Estrada, and Pfc. Steven D. Lopez – Vietnam War, Alpha Company
- Sgt. Jose G. Lopez, Cpl. Charles W. Bryan (KIA), and LCpl. Robert C. Barnes – Vietnam War, Bravo Company
- Cpl. Steven M. Lowery and LCpl. Norman W. Vancor – Vietnam War, Charlie Company
- Cpl. Harry J. Corsetti, Cpl. Charles T. Sexton, and Pvt. James E. Honeycutt (KIA) – Vietnam War, 3rd Force Company

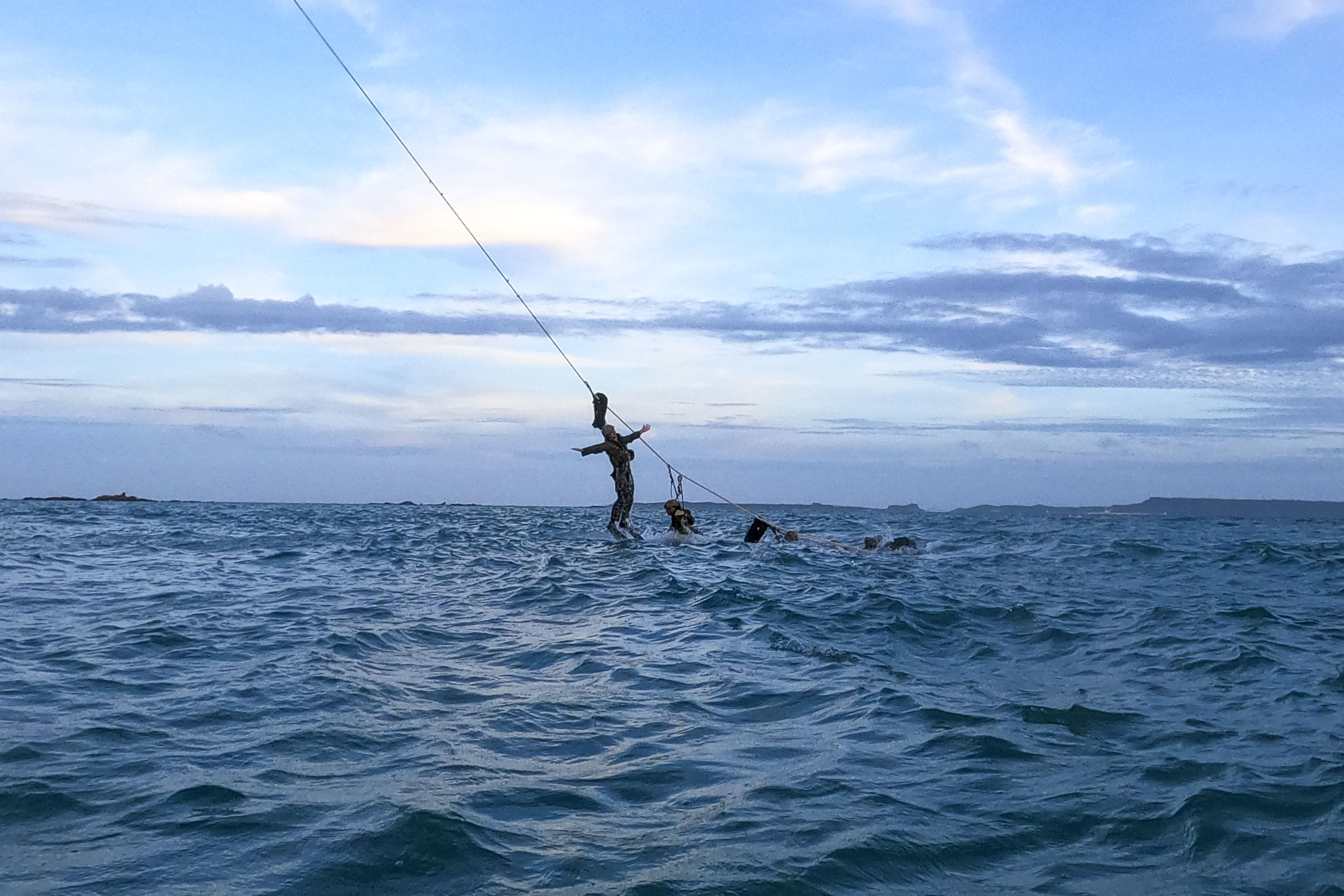
U.S. Marines with 3d Reconnaissance Battalion, 3d Marine Division, conduct special patrol insertion and extraction rigging training at Kin Blue training area, Okinawa, Japan, on 12 Aug. 2021. SPIE rigging techniques are used to rapidly insert and extract Marines when a landing zone is unavailable. (U.S. Marine Corps photo by Cpl. Levi J. Guerra)

== Notable former members ==
- James Buchli, Executive Officer and Company Commander for B Company during the Vietnam War

== See also ==
- List of United States Marine Corps battalions
- Organization of the United States Marine Corps
