= Richard A. Anderson =

Richard Allen Anderson
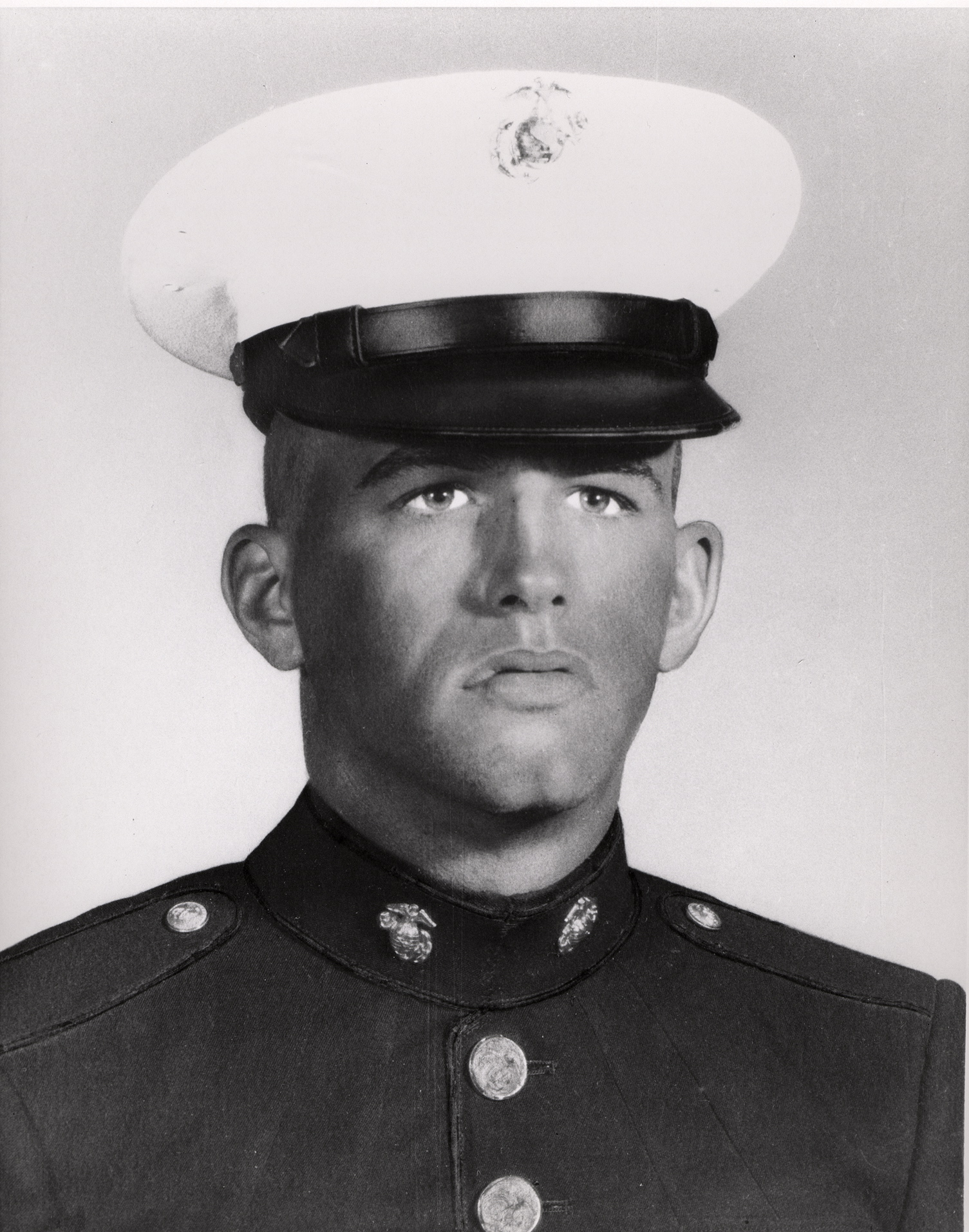
- Richard A. Anderson, Medal of Honor recipient
- Born: 16 April 1948; Washington, D.C., U.S.
- Died: 24 August 1969 (aged 21) near Vandegrift Combat Base, Quảng Trị Province, Republic of Vietnam
- Burial place: Forest Park Cemetery, Houston, Texas
- Military career
- Allegiance: United States of America
- Branch: United States Marine Corps
- Service years: 1968–1969
- Rank: Lance Corporal
- Units: Company E, 3rd Reconnaissance Battalion, 3rd Marine Division
- Conflicts: Vietnam War †
- Awards: Medal of Honor; Purple Heart; Combat Action Ribbon

Lance Corporal Richard Allen Anderson (16 April 1948 – 24 August 1969) was a United States Marine who was posthumously awarded the Medal of Honor for his heroic actions above and beyond the call of duty in August 1969 during the Vietnam War.

On 24 August 1969, Anderson's platoon was ambushed near Vandegrift Combat Base in Quang Tri Province. Anderson was wounded early in the skirmish but delivered suppressing fire on the North Vietnamese forces. When a militant threw a grenade at the American forces, Anderson threw himself on it and saved the life of another Marine.

== Biography ==
Anderson was born on 16 April 1948, in Washington, D.C. At an early age, he moved with his parents to Houston, Texas. He graduated from M.B. Smiley High School there in May 1966, then attended San Jacinto Junior College in Pasadena, Texas, for a year and a half.

Anderson enlisted in the Marine Corps in Houston on 8 April 1968. Upon completion of recruit training with the 2d Recruit Training Battalion, Marine Corps Recruit Depot, San Diego, California, he received individual combat training with the 1st Battalion, 2d Infantry Training Regiment, Marine Corps Base, Camp Pendleton, California, and returned to San Diego to attend Sea School. Anderson was promoted to Private First Class (PFC) effective 1 July 1968.

PFC Anderson completed his training in October 1968 and was ordered to the Far East, where he joined Sub Unit #1, Provisional Service Battalion, 9th Marine Amphibious Brigade.

In November 1968, Anderson was reassigned duty with the 3rd Marine Division in the Republic of Vietnam, and served initially as a rifleman with Company D, 1st Battalion, 4th Marines. In January 1969, he assumed duty as a scout, and later, Assistant Fire Team Leader with Company E, 3rd Reconnaissance Battalion, 3rd Marine Division. Anderson was promoted to Lance Corporal effective 1 June 1969.

On 24 August 1969, while participating in combat approximately 12 miles northwest of Vandegrift Combat Base in Quang Tri Province, Anderson was killed in action.

== Medal of Honor citation ==
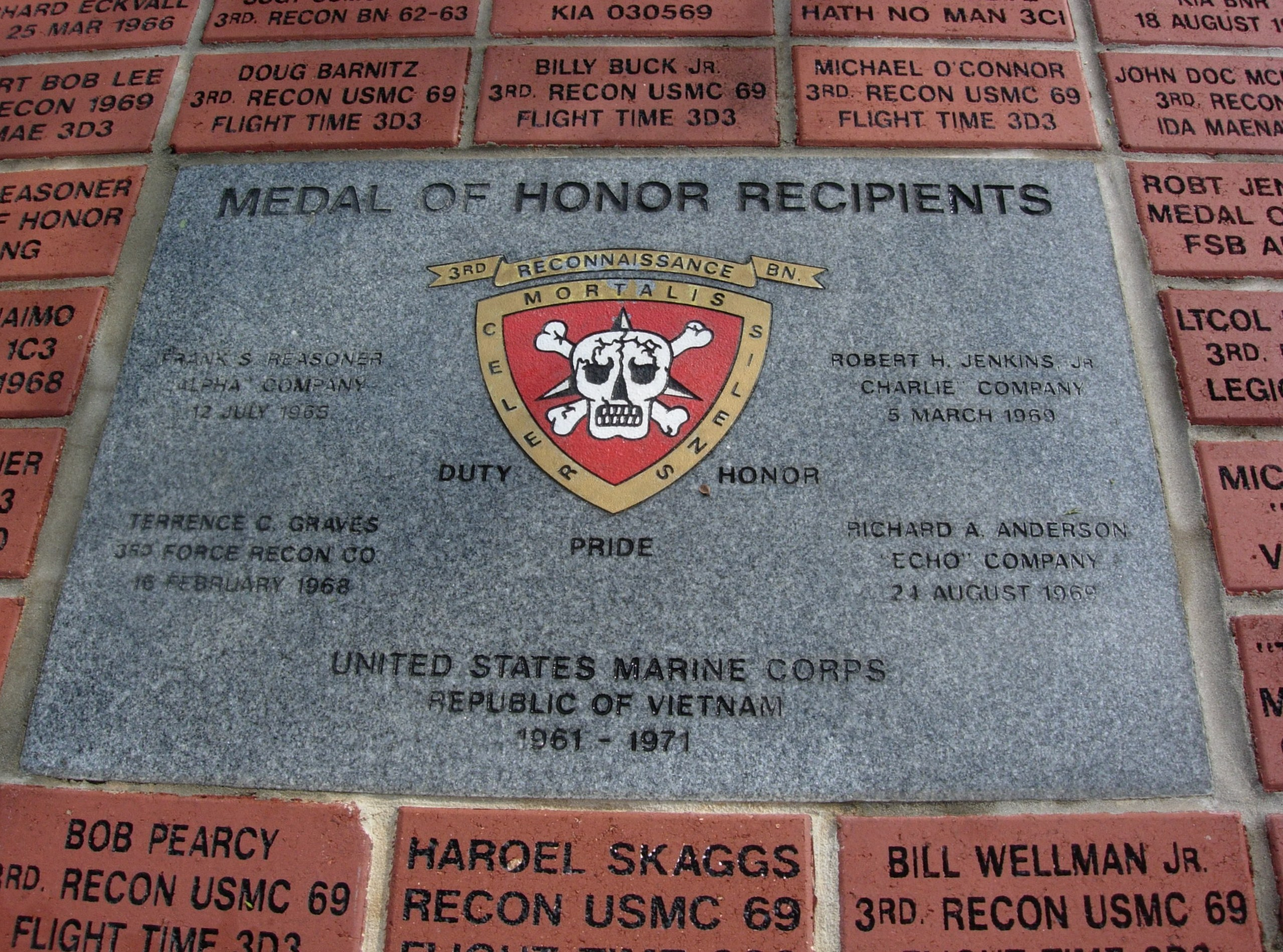
3rd Reconnaissance Medal of Honor Monument Ocala, Florida Memorial Park

The President of the United States in the name of United States Congress takes pride in presenting the MEDAL OF HONOR posthumously to

LANCE CORPORAL RICHARD A. ANDERSON
UNITED STATES MARINE CORPS

for service as set forth in the following

CITATION:

For conspicuous gallantry and intrepidity at the risk of his life above and beyond the call of duty while serving as an Assistant Fire Team Leader with Company E, 3rd Reconnaissance Battalion, 3rd Marine Division, in connection with combat operations against an armed enemy in the Republic of Vietnam. While conducting a patrol during the early morning hours of 24 August 1969, Lance Corporal Anderson's reconnaissance team came under a heavy volume of automatic weapons and machine gun fire from a numerically superior and well-concealed enemy force. Although painfully wounded in both legs and knocked to the ground during the initial moments of the fierce fire fight, Lance Corporal Anderson assumed a prone position and continued to deliver intense suppressive fire in an attempt to repulse the attackers. Moments later he was wounded a second time by an enemy soldier who had approached to within eight feet of the team's position. Undaunted, he continued to pour a relentless stream of fire at the assaulting unit, even while a companion was treating his legs wounds. Observing an enemy hand grenade land between himself and the other Marine, Lance Corporal Anderson immediately rolled over and covered the lethal weapon with his body, absorbing the full effects of the detonation. By his indomitable courage, inspiring initiative, and selfless devotion to duty, Lance Corporal Anderson was instrumental in saving several Marines from serious injury or possible death. His actions were in keeping with the highest traditions of the Marine Corps and of the Department of the Navy. He gallantly gave his life in the service of his country.

/S/ Richard M. Nixon

== Awards and decorations ==

1st row	Medal of Honor		
2nd row	Purple Heart	Combat Action Ribbon	Purple Heart
3rd row	Vietnam Service Medal with 4 Campaign stars	RVN Gallantry Cross Unit Citation with Palm	Vietnam Campaign Medal

== See also ==
- List of Medal of Honor recipients
- List of Medal of Honor recipients for the Vietnam War
