= FlightTime Radio =

- FlightTime Radio - In the Air, On the Air, and Over the Internet!
- Genre: Aviation Radio Programming
- Running time: Saturday morning
- Country of origin: United States
- Language: English
- Home station: WBOB AM-600, FM-100.3 and FM-107.7
- Starring: C. Willwerth, Co-Host M. Shirley, Co-Host
- Produced by: The FlightTime Radio Show
- Original release: January 5, 2008
- Website: flighttimeradio.com
- Podcast: www.flighttimeradio.com/Podpage.htm

The FlightTime Radio Show is a weekly aviation radio program based in Jacksonville, Florida. The program delivers tips and information on all aspects of aviation to both pilots and non-pilots. The show features a diverse range of guests, from WWII veterans to present-day students, pilots, and astronauts.

== History ==
In June 2006, the city of Jacksonville, Florida, passed an ordinance prohibiting citizens from working on aircraft at home. The law specifically targeted owners and builders of aircraft. Milford Shirley, President of EAA Chapter 193, and chapter members joined forces with members of EAA Chapter 1379 to challenge the ordinance. The efforts to repeal the ordinance were successful. In October 2007, the City Council voted unanimously to remove the law.

In a radio interview during the repeal process, it was suggested to Mr. Shirley that a talk radio program about the fun and joy of flying, covering all aspects of aviation, would serve the community well.

On January 5, 2008, FlightTime Radio produced its first live broadcast from the studios of WBOB AM-1320. During its time on the air, FlightTime Radio changed its broadcast frequency to WBOB AM-1530 and is now on WBOB AM-600, FM-100.3, and FM-107.7, covering Northeast Florida. The change has considerably increased the broadcast area of the program. Since the first show, the program has aired live every Saturday morning. The programming is now available through many PodCast outlets, The FlightTime Radio Show is also available four times each day, seven days per week, on the world's only 24-hour internet aviation radio station, Flight Line Radio. The show is known for doing "live" remote broadcasts in support of aviation events. In early 2010, the show was invited to be broadcast by the Smithsonian Steven F. Udvar-Hazy Center during the National Air and Space Museum's annual Father's Day "Become a Pilot" celebration and was invited back for a second year in 2011. The hosts from the Airplane Geeks podcast joined Milford and Charlie for that 2011 FlightTime Radio live broadcast, which was incorporated into Airplane Geeks Episode 152.

In 2010, FlightTime Radio introduced a new segment called Flying Down Under. Produced by Steve Visscher and Grant McHerron from the Plane Crazy Down Under podcast in Australia, the segment appears every two weeks and provides insight into the world of aviation in Australia.

The FlightTime Radio Show was thought at the time to be the only live over-the-air aviation broadcast in the world. Show sponsors include the Piper Aircraft Company, among others.
