= Reasoners Run =

Stream in Ohio, U.S.

Coordinates: 39°37′19″N 81°35′33″W

Reasoners Run is a stream in the U.S. state of Ohio. It is a tributary of Olive Green Creek in Morgan County.

Reasoners Run was named for a man named Reasoner who often visited the stream in order to hunt.

== See also ==
- List of rivers of Ohio
