= Terrence C. Graves =

United States Marine Corps Medal of Honor recipient

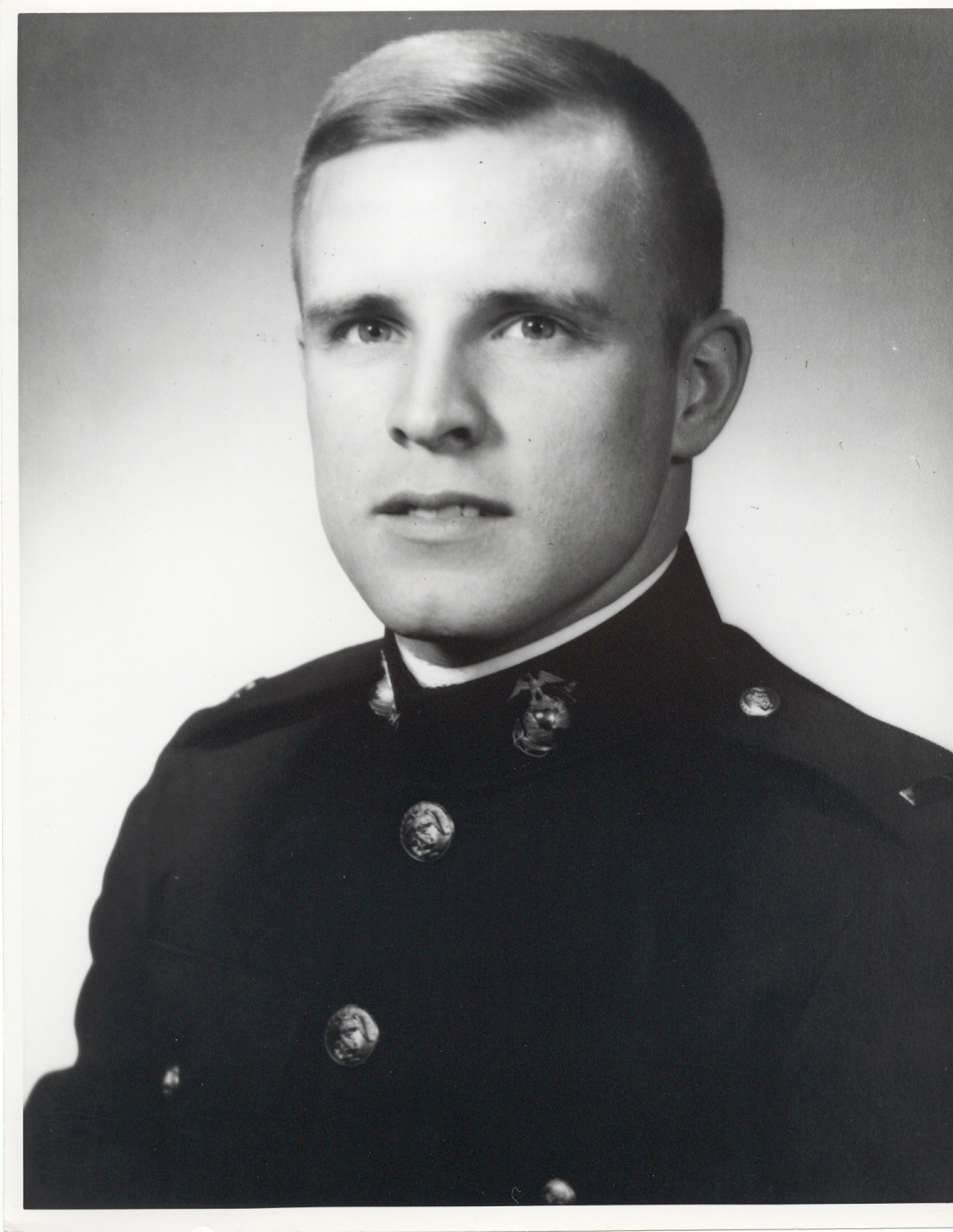
- Official portrait, 1967
- Born: 6 July 1945; Corpus Christi, Texas, U.S.
- Died: 16 February 1968 (aged 22) near Đông Hà, Quảng Trị Province, Republic of Vietnam
- Burial place: Woodlawn Cemetery, Hamilton, New York, U.S.
- Military career
- Allegiance: United States of America
- Branch: United States Marine Corps
- Service years: 1967–1968
- Rank: Second Lieutenant
- Units: 3rd Force Reconnaissance Company, 3rd Reconnaissance Battalion, 3rd Marine Division
- Conflicts: Vietnam War †
- Awards: Medal of Honor; Purple Heart Medal; Combat Action Ribbon

Terrence Collinson Graves (6 July 1945 – 16 February 1968) was a United States Marine Corps officer who was posthumously awarded the Medal of Honor for his "outstanding courage, superb leadership and indomitable fighting spirit" on 16 February 1968, during the Vietnam War.

== Biography ==
Terrence Collinson Graves was born on 6 July 1945, in Corpus Christi, Texas, and grew up in Groton, New York. He graduated from Edmeston Central High School, Edmeston, New York, in 1963, and from Miami University, Oxford, Ohio, with a B.A. degree in history on 19 April 1967.

During his school years, he was a senior patrol leader of the Boy Scouts of America and President of the Methodist Youth Fellowship. Graves was battalion commander of his NROTC unit and a member of Beta Theta Pi fraternity while attending Miami University.

=== Marine Corps service ===
In 1967, Graves was commissioned a Marine Corps second lieutenant upon graduation from Miami University. He completed The Basic School, Marine Corps Schools, Quantico, Virginia, in November 1967.

In December 1967, he arrived in the Republic of Vietnam, where he was assigned duty as a platoon commander of "Team Box Score", 3rd Force Reconnaissance Company, 3rd Reconnaissance Battalion, 3rd Marine Division. While on patrol 6 miles (9.7 km) northwest of Đông Hà in Quang Tri Province on 16 February 1968, his unit was engaged by People's Army of Vietnam (PAVN) soldiers. Wounded in the firefight, Lt. Graves called in air strikes and direct artillery fire while he guided his troops to a helicopter evacuation zone. After successfully guiding the majority of his men to the landing zone, he stayed behind to tend to one wounded soldier, calling for an additional air evacuation to remove the wounded soldier from the area. Short on ammunition and continuing to direct artillery fire, he was killed in action when the second helicopter he had boarded crashed after being hit by PAVN fire.

== Military awards ==
Graves's military decorations and awards include:

	Medal of Honor	
Purple Heart Medal	Combat Action Ribbon	National Defense Service Medal
Vietnam Service Medal w/ two 3/16" bronze stars	Republic of Vietnam Gallantry Cross w/ Silver Star	Republic of Vietnam Campaign Medal w/ 1960– device

== Medal of Honor citation ==
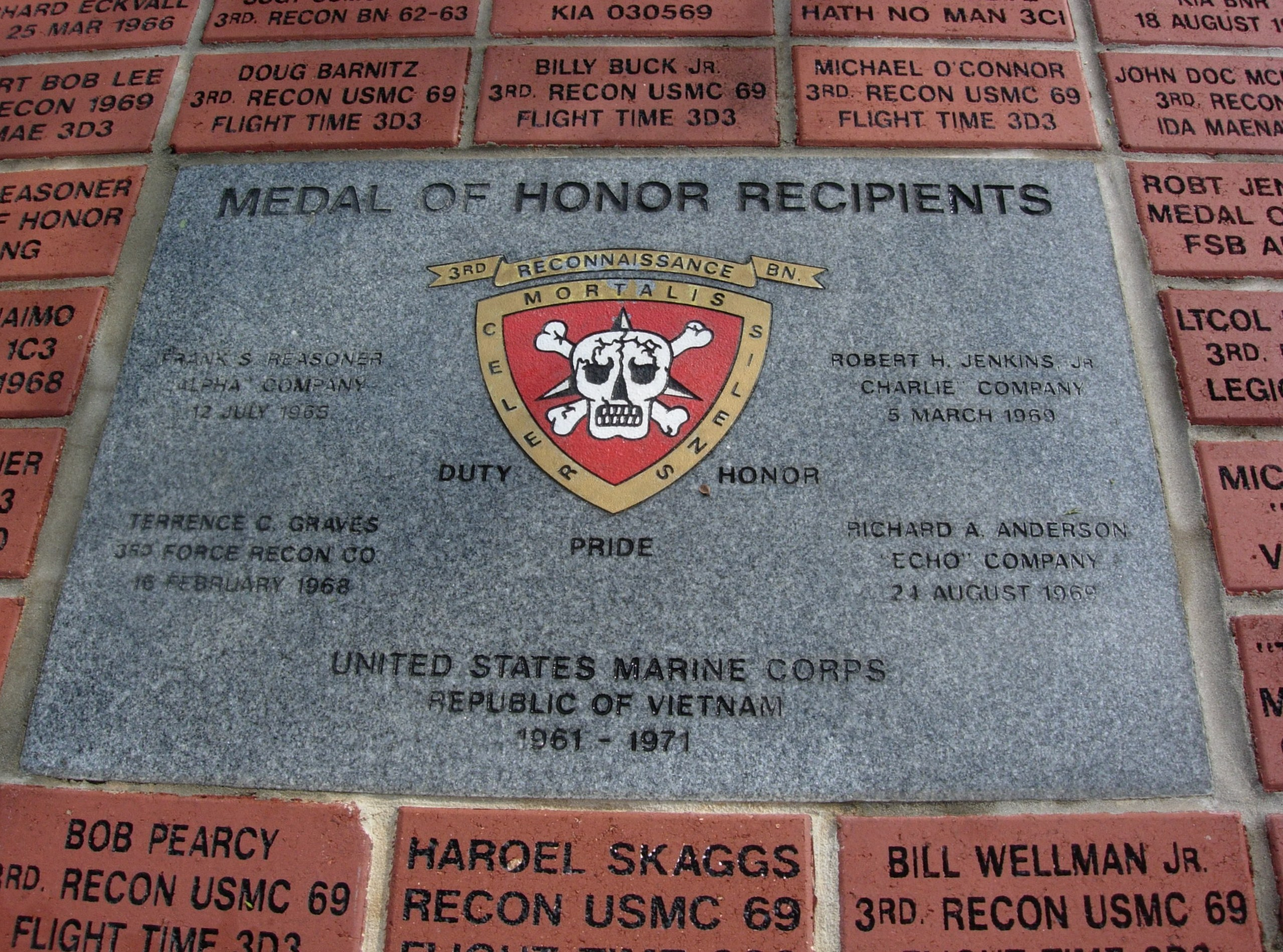
3rd Reconnaissance Medal of Honor Monument Ocala, Florida Memorial Park

The President of the United States in the name of United States Congress takes pride in presenting the MEDAL OF HONOR posthumously to

SECOND LIEUTENANT TERRENCE C. GRAVES
UNITED STATES MARINE CORPS

for service as set forth in the following

CITATION:

"For conspicuous gallantry and intrepidity at the risk of his life above and beyond the call of duty as a platoon commander with the 3rd Force Reconnaissance Company. While on a long-range reconnaissance mission, 2d Lt. Graves' eight-man patrol observed seven enemy soldiers approaching their position. Reacting instantly, he deployed his men and directed their fire on the approaching enemy. After the fire had ceased, he and two patrol members commenced a search of the area, and suddenly came under a heavy volume of hostile small arms and automatic weapons fire from a numerically superior enemy force. When one of his men was hit by the enemy fire, 2d Lt. Graves moved through the fire-swept area to his radio and, while directing suppressive fire from his men, requested air support and adjusted a heavy volume of artillery and helicopter gunship fire upon the enemy. After attending the wounded, 2d Lt. Graves, accompanied by another Marine, moved from his relatively safe position to confirm the results of the earlier engagement. Observing that several of the enemy were still alive, he launched a determined assault, eliminating the remaining enemy troops. He then began moving the patrol to a landing zone for extraction, when the unit again came under intense fire which wounded two more Marines and 2d Lt. Graves. Refusing medical attention, he once more adjusted air strikes and artillery fire upon the enemy while directing the fire of his men. He led his men to a new landing site into which he skillfully guided the incoming aircraft and boarded his men while remaining exposed to the hostile fire. Realizing that one of the wounded had not embarked, he directed the aircraft to depart and, along with another Marine, moved to the side of the casualty. Confronted with a shortage of ammunition, 2d Lt. Graves utilized supporting arms and directed fire until a second helicopter arrived. At this point, the volume of enemy fire intensified, hitting the helicopter and causing it to crash shortly after liftoff. All aboard were killed. 2d Lt. Graves' outstanding courage, superb leadership and indomitable fighting spirit throughout the day were in keeping with the highest traditions of the Marine Corps and the United States Navy. He gallantly gave his life for his country."

/S/ Richard M. Nixon

== Other honors and recognition ==
- In 2001, a memorial honoring Graves was dedicated on Main Street in the village of Groton, Tompkins County, New York.
- Graves' name is inscribed on the Vietnam Veterans Memorial (The Wall) — on Panel 39E – Row 071.
- Graves Hall, Officer Barracks, The Basic School, Marine Corps Base Quantico, Virginia, is named in honor of Terrence Graves
- Graves Lounge, Millett Hall, Miami University, is named in honor of 2ndLt Graves. His medal of honor and citation are on display there.
- Lt. Terrance C. Graves Marine Corps League Detachment # 1330, Butler County Ohio is named in honor of 2ndLt Graves
- The Honor Graduate from the Marine Corps' Ground Intelligence Officer Course is presented with the Terrence C. Graves Award.
- Name enshrined at the Pentagon's "Hall of Heroes" 2nd. Fl.; Corridor 10, left at the ramps.

== See also ==
- List of Medal of Honor recipients
- List of Medal of Honor recipients for the Vietnam War
