= Frank S. Reasoner =

United States Marine Corps Medal of Honor recipient (1937–1965)

Frank Stanley Reasoner
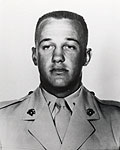
- Frank S. Reasoner, Medal of Honor recipient
- Born: 16 September 1937; Spokane, Washington, U.S.
- Died: 12 July 1965 (aged 27); Đại Lộc District, Quang Nam Province, South Vietnam
- Burial place: Greenwood Cemetery Kellogg Idaho
- Education: USMA, B.S. 1962
- Military career
- Allegiance: United States
- Branch: United States Marine Corps
- Service years: 1955–1965
- Rank: First lieutenant
- Unit: 3rd Reconnaissance Battalion
- Commands: Company A, 3rd Reconnaissance Battalion
- Conflicts: Vietnam War †
- Awards: Medal of Honor; Purple Heart Medal; Combat Action Ribbon

Frank Stanley Reasoner (16 September 1937 – 12 July 1965) was a United States Marine Corps officer who was awarded the Medal of Honor posthumously for his heroic actions above and beyond the call of duty in 1965 during the Vietnam War.

== Biography ==
Reasoner was born in Spokane, Washington in September 1937. He moved with his parents to Kellogg, Idaho, in 1948, and graduated from Kellogg High School in June 1955. He enlisted in the U.S. Marine Corps three months before his 18th birthday.

He completed recruit training at the San Diego Recruit Depot in August, and was promoted to private first class. He then went to and completed infantry training at Camp Pendleton, California. He was designated an Airborne Radio Operator in 1956 upon completing Airman School, Naval Air Technical Training Center, Jacksonville, Florida, and the Communication Electronics School at San Diego. He was next assigned to Marine Wing Service Group 37, 3rd Marine Aircraft Wing, El Toro, California, and while there was promoted to corporal. He was transferred to the Naval Academy Preparatory School at United States Naval Training Center Bainbridge, Maryland in 1957, then served as a guard at Marine Barracks, Annapolis, Maryland.

In January 1958, he was promoted to sergeant prior to receiving Congressional appointment to the U.S. Military Academy, sponsored by U.S. Senator Henry Dworshak of Idaho. Successfully completing the Academy's entrance examinations in June 1958, Sgt. Reasoner was transferred to the inactive Marine Corps Reserve and enrolled as a cadet. While at the Military Academy, he lettered in baseball, and wrestling, and won four straight Brigade boxing championships in four different weight classes. Upon graduation, 6 June 1962, he was awarded a Bachelor of Science degree and returned to the Marine Corps as a second lieutenant.

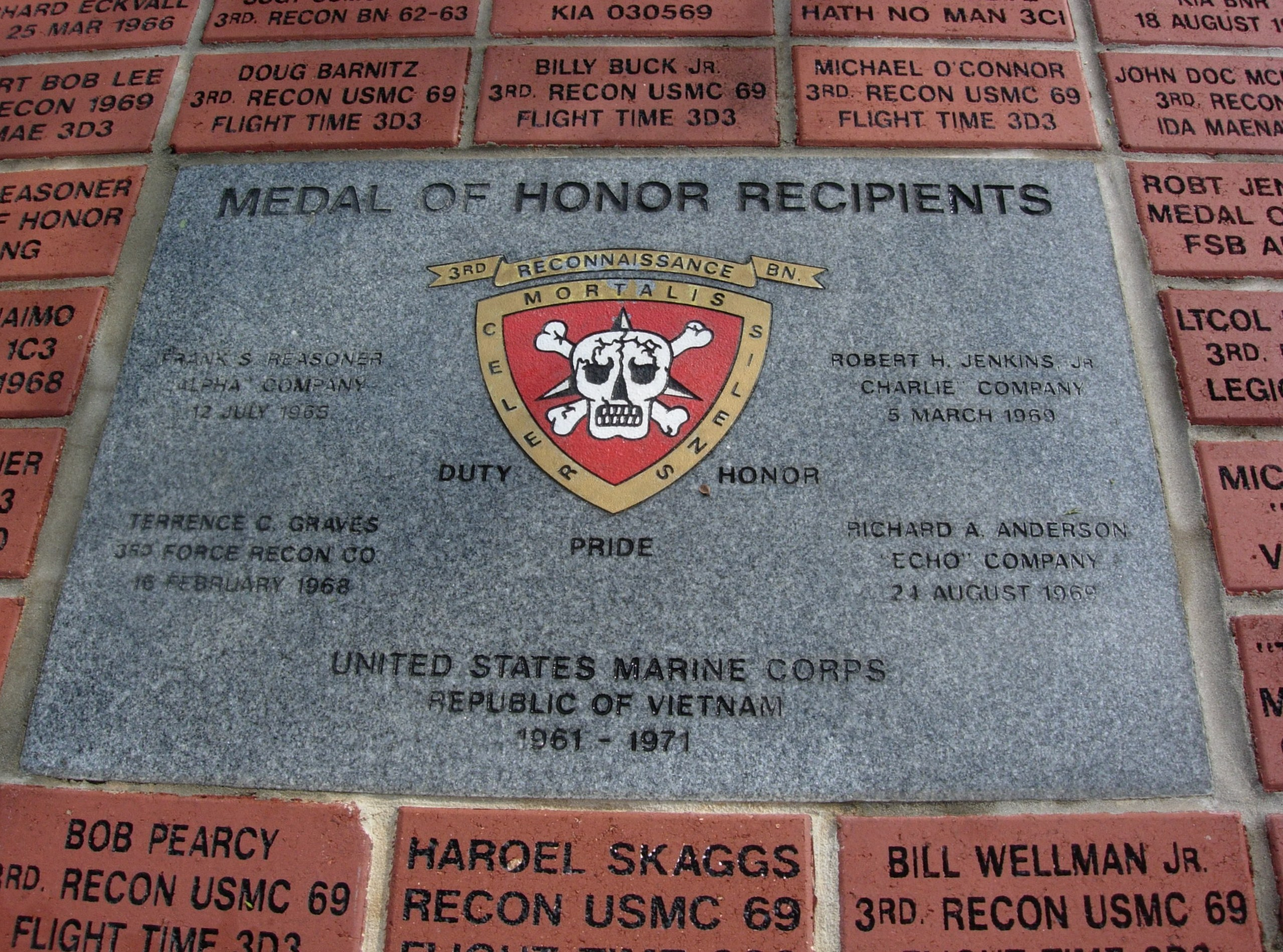
3rd Reconnaissance Medal of Honor Monument at Ocala, Florida Memorial Park

Reasoner was promoted to first lieutenant in December, and completed Officers Basic School at Marine Corps Schools, Quantico, Virginia, in January 1963. He then embarked for a three-year tour of duty with the Fleet Marine Force in the Pacific area. During his entire overseas tour, he served with the 3rd Reconnaissance Battalion. Assigned initially to the 1st Marine Brigade, at Kāne'ohe Bay, Hawaii, he served with Company A, 3rd Reconnaissance Battalion, 4th Marines, and moved with his organization to Vietnam in April 1965. On 20 June 1965, he was designated Commanding Officer, Company A, 3rd Reconnaissance Battalion, 3rd Marine Division (Reinforced).

On 12 July 1965, Reasoner was leading an 18-man patrol from Company A near Đại Lộc, approximately 18 km southwest of Danang, when it was attacked by a company-sized Vietcong force. Reasoner was killed and 3 other Marines were wounded in the engagement.

USS Reasoner was named after Reasoner.

The 3rd Reconnaissance Battalion base camp at Hill 327, Danang, South Vietnam was named "Camp Reasoner" and dedicated to his memory. The hand-lettered sign near the gates of Camp Reasoner read: "…First Lieutenant Reasoner sacrificed his life to save one of his wounded Marines. 'Greater Love Hath No Man'." (See John 15:13 for "Greater love..." quote.)

== Military awards ==
Reasoner's military decorations and awards include:

Medal of Honor	Purple Heart Medal	Combat Action Ribbon
Navy Presidential Unit Citation	National Defense Service Medal	Vietnam Service Medal w/ one 3/16" bronze star
Republic of Vietnam Meritorious Unit Citation (Gallantry Cross) w/ Palm and Frame	Republic of Vietnam Meritorious Unit Citation (Civil Actions) w/ Palm and Frame	Republic of Vietnam Campaign Medal w/ 1960- device

== Medal of Honor citation ==
The President of the United States, in the name of The Congress takes pride in presenting the MEDAL OF HONOR posthumously to

FIRST LIEUTENANT FRANK S. REASONER
UNITED STATES MARINE CORPS

for service as set forth in the following

Citation:

For conspicuous gallantry and intrepidity at the risk of his life above and beyond the call of duty. The reconnaissance patrol led by 1st Lt. Reasoner had deeply penetrated heavily controlled enemy territory when it came under extremely heavy fire from an estimated 50 to 100 Viet Cong insurgents. Accompanying the advance party and the point that consisted of 5 men, he immediately deployed his men for an assault after the Viet Cong had opened fire from numerous concealed positions. Boldly shouting encouragement, and virtually isolated from the main body, he organized a base of fire for an assault on the enemy positions. The slashing fury of the Viet Cong machinegun and automatic weapons fire made it impossible for the main body to move forward. Repeatedly exposing himself to the devastating attack he skillfully provided covering fire, killing at least 2 Viet Cong and effectively silencing an automatic weapons position in a valiant attempt to effect evacuation of a wounded man. As casualties began to mount his radio operator was wounded and 1st Lt. Reasoner immediately moved to his side and tended his wounds. When the radio operator was hit a second time while attempting to reach a covered position, 1st Lt. Reasoner courageously running to his aid through the grazing machinegun fire fell mortally wounded. His indomitable fighting spirit, valiant leadership and unflinching devotion to duty provided the inspiration that was to enable the patrol to complete its mission without further casualties. In the face of almost certain death he gallantly gave his life in the service of his country. His actions upheld the highest traditions of the Marine Corps and the U.S. Naval Service.

/S/ Richard M. Nixon

== See also ==
- List of Medal of Honor recipients
- List of Medal of Honor recipients for the Vietnam War
