= USS Reasoner =

United States Navy frigate

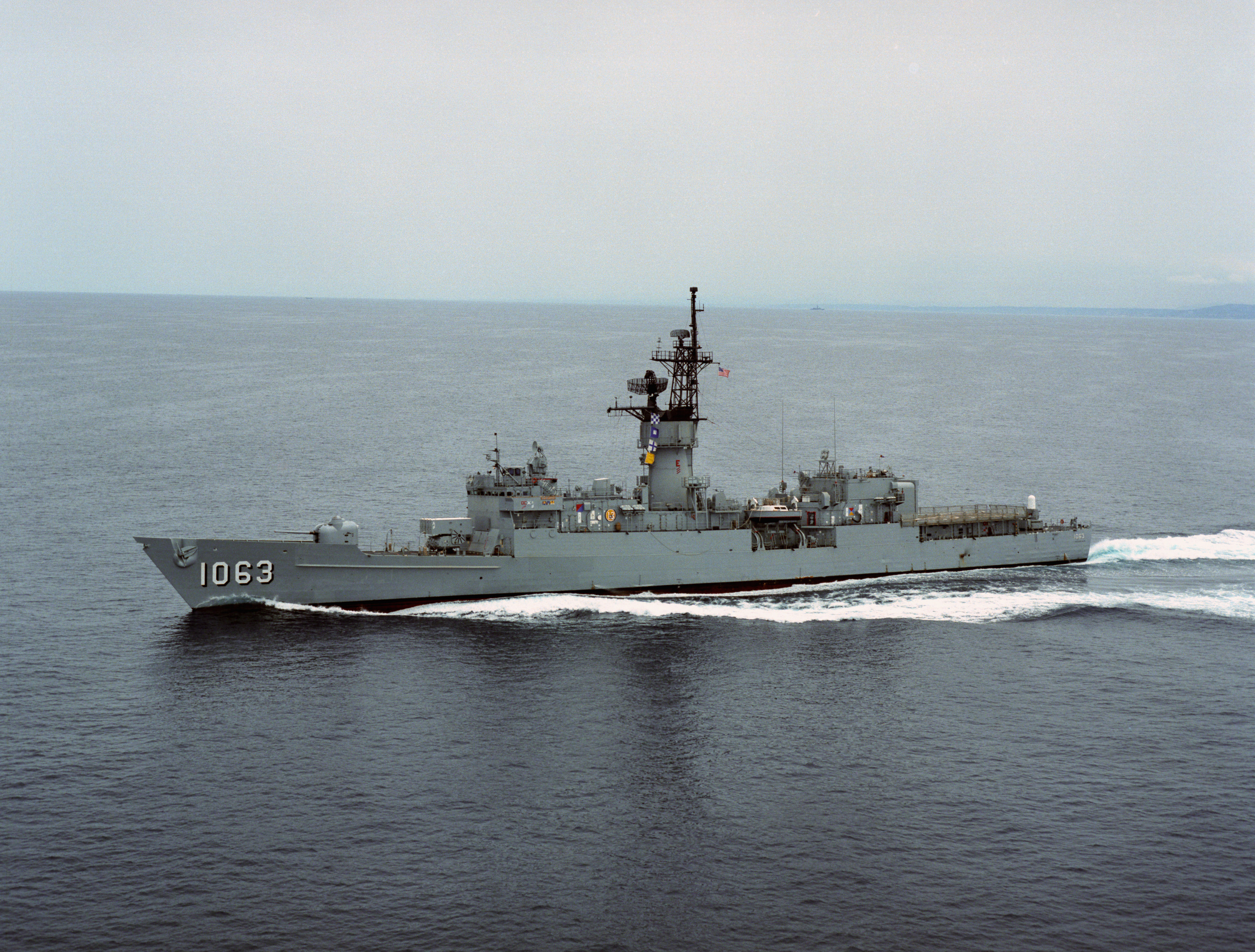
- USS Reasoner (FF-1063)

History

United States
- Name: Reasoner
- Namesake: Frank S. Reasoner
- Ordered: 22 July 1964
- Builder: Lockheed Shipbuilding and Construction Company, Seattle, WA
- Laid down: 6 January 1969
- Launched: 1 August 1970
- Acquired: 22 June 1971
- Commissioned: 31 July 1971
- Decommissioned: 28 August 1993
- Identification: FF-1063
- Motto: Fidelity
- Fate: Leased to Turkey, 1993; Sold to Turkey, 22 February 2002

Turkey
- Name: Kocatepe
- Acquired: 22 February 2002
- Commissioned: 1993
- Fate: Sunk as target, 4 May 2005

General characteristics
- Class & type: Knox-class frigate
- Displacement: 3,011 tons (3,877 full load)
- Length: 438 ft (134 m)
- Beam: 46 ft 9 in (14.25 m)
- Draft: 24 ft 9 in (7.54 m)
- Propulsion: 2 - 1200 psi boilers; 1 geared turbine, 1 shaft; 35,000 shp (26,000 kW)
- Speed: over 27 kn (50 km/h; 31 mph)
- Complement: 18 officers, 267 enlisted
- Sensors & processing systems: AN/SPS-40 Air Search Radar; AN/SPS-67 Surface Search Radar; AN/SQS-26 Sonar; AN/SQR-18 Towed array sonar system; Mk68 Gun Fire Control System
- Electronic warfare & decoys: AN/SLQ-32 Electronics Warfare System
- Armament: one Mk-16 8 cell missile launcher for RUR-5 ASROC and Harpoon missiles; one Mk-42 5-inch/54 caliber gun; Mark 46 torpedoes from four single tube launchers; one Mk-25 BPDMS launcher for Sea Sparrow missiles (later replaced with Phalanx CIWS)
- Aircraft carried: one SH-2 Seasprite (LAMPS I) helicopter

USS Reasoner (FF-1063) was a Knox-class frigate of the United States Navy, named in honor of 1st Lt. Frank S. Reasoner, awarded the Medal of Honor posthumously in the Vietnam War.

== Construction ==
Reasoner was laid down 6 January 1969, by Lockheed Shipbuilding and Construction Company, Seattle, WA and launched 1 August 1970, cosponsored by Mrs. James C. Curry and Mrs. Robert Svingen. Reasoner was commissioned 31 July 1971, Cmdr. Francisco Velazquez-Suarez, USN, commanding. Her hull number, originally DE-1063, was changed in 1975.

== Class design and description ==
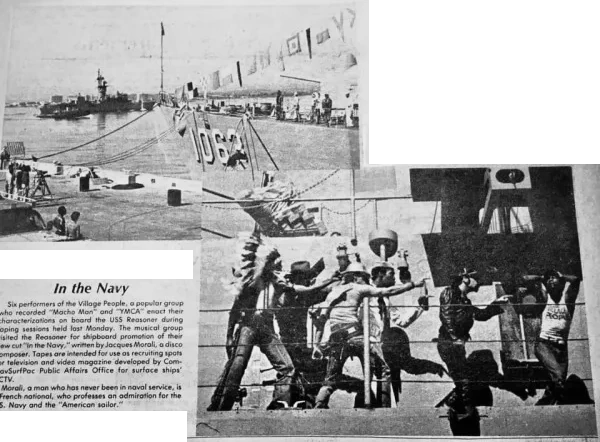
"In the Navy" music video being filmed aboard Reasoner in 1978

The Knox-class design was derived from the Brooke-class frigate, modified to extend range and without a long-range missile system. The ships had an overall length of 438 feet (133.5 m), a beam of 47 feet (14.3 m) and a draft of 25 feet (7.6 m). They displaced 4,066 long tons (4,131 t) at full load. Their crew consisted of 13 officers and 211 enlisted men.

The warships were equipped with one Westinghouse geared steam turbine that drove the single propeller shaft. The turbine was designed to produce 35,000 shaft horsepower (26,000 kW), using steam provided by two C-E boilers, to reach the designed speed of 27 knots (50 km/h; 31 mph). The Knox class had a range of 4,500 nautical miles (8,300 km; 5,200 mi) at a speed of 20 knots (37 km/h; 23 mph).

The Knox-class ships were armed with a 5"/54 caliber Mark 42 gun forward and a single 3-inch/50-caliber gun aft. They mounted an eight-round RUR-5 ASROC launcher between the 5-inch (127 mm) gun and the bridge. Close-range anti-submarine defense was provided by two twin 12.75-inch (324 mm) Mk 32 torpedo tubes. The ships were equipped with a torpedo-carrying DASH drone helicopter; its telescoping hangar and landing pad were positioned amidships aft of the mack. Beginning in the 1970s, the DASH was replaced by a SH-2 Seasprite LAMPS I helicopter and the hangar and landing deck were accordingly enlarged. Most ships also had the 3-inch (76 mm) gun replaced by an eight-cell BPDMS missile launcher in the early 1970s.

== Service history ==
Reasoner first deployed with HSL 31 "Lamps" SH2D in 1973 to Southeast Asia and took part in Operation End Sweep (the removal of mines in Haiphong Harbor). Reasoner was decommissioned on 28 August 1993 and subsequently leased to Turkey, where the ship was recommissioned as Kocatepe. On 22 February 2002, she was finally purchased by Turkey. On 4 May 2005, the ship was used as a target and sunk in the Mediterranean Sea.

== In popular culture ==
- Reasoner is featured in the music video for the 1979 Village People song "In the Navy".

== Awards and decorations ==
- Joint Meritorious Unit Award
- Navy Unit Commendation
- Navy Meritorious Unit Commendation
- Navy "E" Ribbon (2)
- Navy Expeditionary Medal
- National Defense Service Medal w/service star
- Armed Forces Expeditionary Medal w/bronze star
- Southwest Asia Service Medal w/bronze star
- Humanitarian Service Medal w/bronze star
- Navy Sea Service Deployment Ribbon
- Kuwait Liberation Medal (Kuwait)
