= Dose rate =

Quantity of radiation absorbed or delivered per unit time

A dose rate is quantity of radiation absorbed or delivered per unit time. It is often indicated in micrograys per hour (μGy/h) or as an equivalent dose rate Ḣ_{T} in rems per hour (rem/hr) or sieverts per hour (Sv/h).

Dose and dose rate are used to measure different quantities in the same way that distance and speed are used to measure different quantities. When considering stochastic radiation effects, only the total dose is relevant; each incremental unit of dose increases the probability that the stochastic effect happens. When considering deterministic effects, the dose rate also matters. The total dose can be above the threshold for a deterministic effect, but if the dose is spread out over a long period of time, the effect is not observed. Consider the sunburn, a deterministic effect: when exposed to bright sunlight for only ten minutes at a high UV Index, that is to say a high average dose rate, the skin can turn red and painful. The same total amount of energy from indirect sunlight spread out over several years - a low average dose rate - would not cause a sunburn at all, although it may still cause skin cancer.
