= Flight Time (3rd Reconnaissance Battalion) =

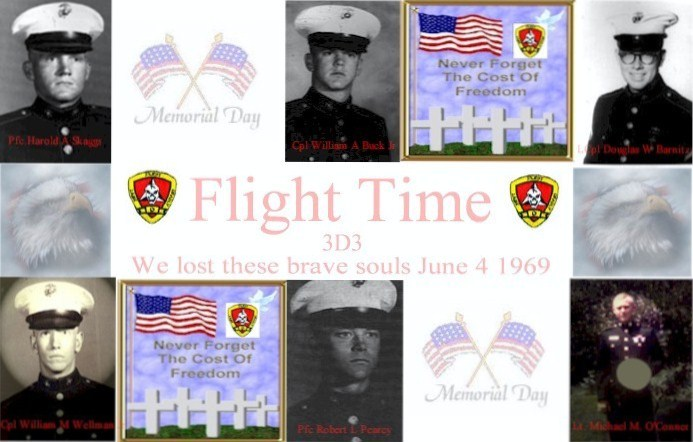
- Team Picture
- Active: 2 June 1969 – 4 June 1969
- Country: Vietnam
- Allegiance: United States
- Branch: United States Marine Corps
- Type: Reconnaissance
- Role: Patrol/Renconnaissance
- Size: 6
- Motto: Celer Mortalis Silens
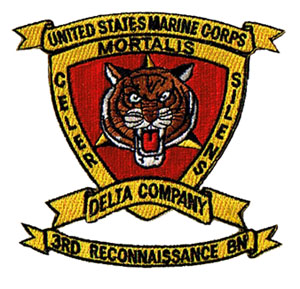
- Colors

Commanders
- Notable commanders: Stanley Kozlowski

Recon team "Flight Time", D Company, 3rd Reconnaissance Battalion, was the last full team from the United States Marine Corps 3rd Reconnaissance Battalion to be killed in action during the Vietnam War, on 4 June 1969.

== Last mission ==
On 2 June 1969 Recon Team "Flight Time" from D Company, 3rd Reconnaissance Battalion, was inserted on Hill 471 about a kilometer south of Khe Sanh in the Quảng Trị province, Vietnam, On the night of 3/4 June 1969 the team was attacked by an enemy force and requested both emergency extraction and immediate reinforcement. Communications with the team were lost at 0320. When the reactionary force arrived a little after 0400 they found the six members of "Flight Time" dead. Five members of the team were in a small trench; the sixth, Cpl. Buck, was approximately 10 meters further down the hillside.

== Flight Time members ==
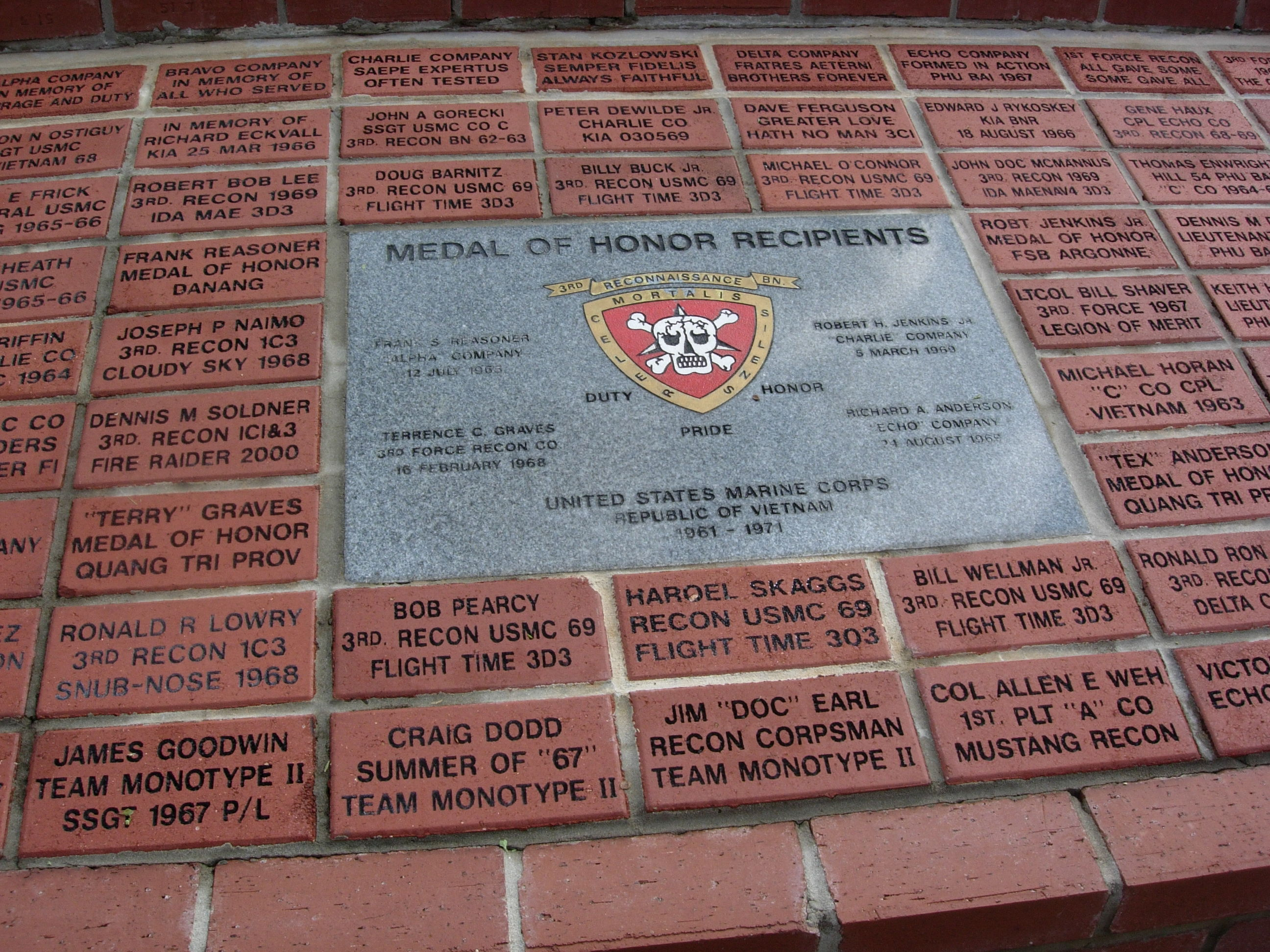
USMC 3rd Reconnaissance Battalion and Team "Flight Time" Monument Ocala, Florida

- 1stLt Michael M. O'Connor, Waterloo, IA Panel 23w Line 66
- Cpl William A. Buck, Fayetteville, NC Panel 23w Line 61
- Cpl William M. Wellman, New Carlisle, OH Panel 23w Line 69
- LCpl Douglas W. Barnitz, Columbus, OH Panel 23w Line 61
- Pfc Robert L. Pearcy, Big Bear Lake, CA Panel 23w Line 67
- Pfc Harold A. Skaggs, Phoenix, AZ Panel 23w Line 68

== See also ==
- 3rd Recon "Flight Time"
- 3rd Marine Division
- United States Marine Corps Reconnaissance Battalions
- Organization of the United States Marine Corps
