= Radiation and health =

Radiation and health may refer to:

- Electromagnetic radiation and health
- Health threat from cosmic rays
- Ionizing radiation#Health effects
- Mobile phone radiation and health

== See also ==
- Radiological hazard (disambiguation)
- Category:Radiation health effects
