= Electromagnetic radiation and health =

Aspect of public health

Types of radiation in the electromagnetic spectrum

Electromagnetic radiation can be classified into two types: ionizing radiation and non-ionizing radiation, based on the capability of a single photon with more than 10 eV energy to ionize atoms or break chemical bonds. Extreme ultraviolet and higher frequencies, such as X-rays or gamma rays are ionizing, and these pose their own special hazards: see radiation poisoning. The field strength of electromagnetic radiation is measured in volts per meter (V/m).

The most common health hazard of radiation is sunburn, which causes between approximately 100,000 and 1 million new skin cancers annually in the United States.

In 2011, the World Health Organization (WHO) and the International Agency for Research on Cancer (IARC) have classified radiofrequency electromagnetic fields as possibly carcinogenic to humans (Group 2B).

== Hazards ==
Dielectric heating from electromagnetic radiation can create a biological hazard. For example, touching or standing around an antenna while a high-power transmitter is in operation can cause burns. The mechanism is the same as that used in a microwave oven.

The heating effect varies with the power and the frequency of the electromagnetic energy, as well as the inverse square of distance to the source. The eyes and testes are particularly susceptible to radio frequency heating due to the paucity of blood flow in these areas that could otherwise dissipate the heat buildup.

Routine measurements in residential settings often include both electric and magnetic field strengths to characterize everyday exposure levels.

=== Workplace exposure ===
Radio frequency (RF) energy at power density levels of 1–10 mW/cm^{2} or higher can cause measurable heating of tissues. Typical RF energy levels encountered by the general public are well below the level needed to cause significant heating, but certain workplace environments near high power RF sources may exceed safe exposure limits. A measure of the heating effect is the specific absorption rate or SAR, which has units of watts per kilogram (W/kg). The IEEE and many national governments have established safety limits for exposure to various frequencies of electromagnetic energy based on SAR, mainly based on ICNIRP Guidelines, which guard against thermal damage.

Industrial installations for induction hardening and melting or on welding equipment may produce considerably higher field strengths and require further examination. If the exposure cannot be determined upon manufacturers' information, comparisons with similar systems or analytical calculations, measurements have to be accomplished. The results of the evaluation help to assess possible hazards to the safety and health of workers and to define protective measures. Since electromagnetic fields may influence passive or active implants of workers, it is essential to consider the exposure at their workplaces separately in the risk assessment.

=== Low-level exposure ===
The World Health Organization (WHO) began a research effort in 1996 to study the health effects from the ever-increasing exposure of people to a diverse range of EMR sources. In 2011, the WHO/International Agency for Research on Cancer (IARC) classified radio frequency electromagnetic fields as possibly carcinogenic to humans (Group 2B), based on an increased risk for glioma and acoustic neuroma associated with wireless phone use. The group responsible for the classification did not quantify the risk. Furthermore, group 2B only indicates a credible association between disease and exposure but does not rule out confounding effects with reasonable confidence. A causal relationship has yet to be established.

Epidemiological studies look for statistical correlations between EM exposure in the field and specific health effects. As of 2019, much of the current work is focused on the study of EM fields in relation to cancer. There are publications which support the existence of complex biological and neurological effects of weaker non-thermal electromagnetic fields (see Bioelectromagnetics), including weak ELF electromagnetic fields and modulated RF and microwave fields.

== Effects by frequency ==
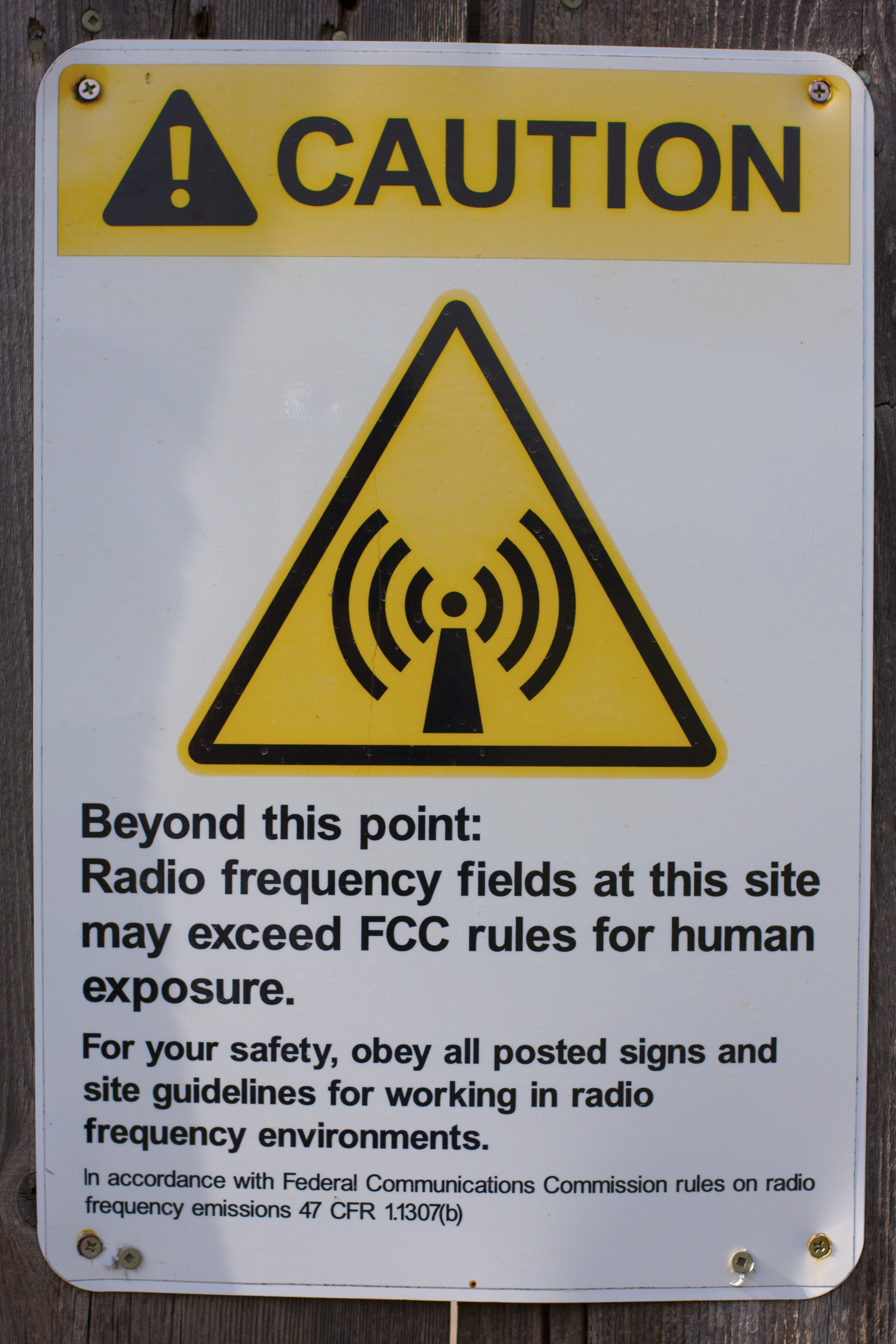
Warning sign next to a transmitter with high field strengths

While the most acute exposures to harmful levels of electromagnetic radiation are immediately realized as burns, the health effects due to chronic or occupational exposure may not manifest for months or years.

=== Extremely low frequency ===
Extremely low frequency EM waves can span from 0 Hz to 3 kHz, though definitions vary across disciplines. The maximum recommended exposure for the general public is 5 kV/m.

ELF waves around 50 Hz to 60 Hz are emitted by power generators, transmission lines and distribution lines, power cables, and electric appliances. Typical household exposure to ELF waves ranges in intensity from 5 V/m for a light bulb to 180 V/m for a stereo, measured at 30 centimetres (12 in) and using 240V power. (120V power systems would be unable to reach this intensity unless an appliance has an internal voltage transformer.)

Overhead power lines range from 1kV for local distribution to 1,150 kV for ultra high voltage lines. These can produce electric fields up to 10kV/m on the ground directly underneath, but 50 m to 100 m away these levels return to approximately ambient. Metal equipment must be maintained at a safe distance from energized high-voltage lines.

Exposure to ELF waves can induce an electric current. Because the human body is conductive, electric currents and resulting voltages differences typically accumulate on the skin but do not reach interior tissues. People can start to perceive high-voltage charges as tingling when hair or clothing in contact with the skin stands up or vibrates. In scientific tests, only about 10% of people could detect a field intensity in the range of 2-5 kV/m. Such voltage differences can also create electric sparks, similar to a discharge of static electricity when nearly touching a grounded object. When receiving such a shock at 5 kV/m, it was reported as painful by only 7% of test participants and by 50% of participants at 10 kV/m.

Associations between exposure to extremely low frequency magnetic fields (ELF MF) and various health outcomes have been investigated through a variety of epidemiological studies. A pooled analysis found consistent evidence of an effect of ELF-MF on childhood leukaemia. An assessment of the burden of disease potentially resulting from ELF MF exposure in Europe found that 1.5–2% of childhood leukaemia cases might be attributable to ELF MF, but uncertainties around causal mechanisms and models of dose-response were found to be considerable.

The International Agency for Research on Cancer (IARC) finds "inadequate evidence" for human carcinogenicity.

=== Shortwave ===
Shortwave (1.6 to 30 MHz) diathermy (where EM waves are used to produce heat) can be used as a therapeutic technique for its analgesic effect and deep muscle relaxation, but has largely been replaced by ultrasound. Temperatures in muscles can increase by 4–6 °C, and subcutaneous fat by 15 °C. The FCC has restricted the frequencies allowed for medical treatment, and most machines in the US use 27.12 MHz. Shortwave diathermy can be applied in either continuous or pulsed mode. The latter came to prominence because the continuous mode produced too much heating too rapidly, making patients uncomfortable. The technique only heats tissues that are good electrical conductors, such as blood vessels and muscle. Adipose tissue (fat) receives little heating by induction fields because an electrical current is not actually going through the tissues.

Studies have been performed on the use of shortwave radiation for cancer therapy and promoting wound healing, with some success. However, at a sufficiently high energy level, shortwave energy can be harmful to human health, potentially causing damage to biological tissues, for example by overheating or inducing electrical currents. The FCC limits for maximum permissible workplace exposure to shortwave radio frequency energy in the range of 3–30 MHz has a plane-wave equivalent power density of (900/ f^{2}) mW/cm^{2} where f is the frequency in MHz, and 100 mW/cm^{2} from 0.3 to 3.0 MHz. For uncontrolled exposure to the general public, the limit is 180/ f^{2} between 1.34 and 30 MHz.

=== Radio and microwave frequencies ===
The classification of mobile phone signals as "possibly carcinogenic to humans" by the World Health Organization (WHO) — "a positive association has been observed between exposure to the agent and cancer for which a causal interpretation is considered by the Working Group to be credible, but chance, bias or confounding could not be ruled out with reasonable confidence"— has been interpreted to mean that there is very little scientific evidence as to phone signal carcinogenesis.

In 2011, the International Agency for Research on Cancer (IARC) classified mobile phone radiation as group 2B, i.e. "possibly carcinogenic," rather than group 2A ("probably carcinogenic") or group 1 ("is carcinogenic"). That means that there "could be some risk" of carcinogenicity, so additional research into the long-term, heavy use of mobile phones needs to be conducted. The WHO concluded in 2014 that "A large number of studies have been performed over the last two decades to assess whether mobile phones pose a potential health risk. To date, no adverse health effects have been established as being caused by mobile phone use."

Since 1962, the microwave auditory effect or tinnitus has been shown from radio frequency exposure at levels below significant heating. Studies during the 1960s in Europe and Russia claimed to show effects on humans, especially the nervous system, from low energy RF radiation; the studies were disputed at the time.

In 2019, reporters from the Chicago Tribune tested the level of radiation from smartphones and found that certain models emitted more than reported by the manufacturers and in some cases more than the U.S. Federal Communications Commission exposure limit. It is unclear if this resulted in any harm to consumers. Some problems apparently involved the phone's ability to detect proximity to a human body and lower the radio power. In response, the FCC began testing some phones itself rather than relying solely on manufacturer certifications.

Microwave and other radio frequencies cause heating, and this can cause burns or eye damage if delivered in high intensity, or hyperthermia as with any powerful heat source. Microwave ovens use this form of radiation, and have shielding to prevent it from leaking out and unintentionally heating nearby objects or people.

=== Millimeter waves ===
In 2009, the US TSA introduced full-body scanners as a primary screening modality in airport security, first as backscatter X-ray scanners, which use ionizing radiation and which the European Union banned in 2011 due to health and safety concerns. These were followed by non-ionizing millimeter wave scanners. Likewise WiGig for personal area networks have opened the 60 GHz and above microwave band to SAR exposure regulations. Previously, microwave applications in these bands were for point-to-point satellite communication with minimal human exposure.

=== Infrared ===
Infrared wavelengths longer than 750 nm can produce changes in the lens of the eye. Glassblower's cataract is an example of a heat injury that damages the anterior lens capsule among unprotected glass and iron workers. Cataract-like changes can occur in workers who observe glowing masses of glass or iron without protective eyewear for prolonged periods over many years.

Exposing skin to infrared radiation near visible light (IR-A) leads to increased production of free radicals. Short-term exposure can be beneficial (activating protective responses), while prolonged exposure can lead to photoaging.

Another important factor is the distance between the worker and the source of radiation. In the case of arc welding, infrared radiation decreases rapidly as a function of distance, so that farther than three feet away from where welding takes place, it does not pose an ocular hazard anymore but, ultraviolet radiation still does. This is why welders wear tinted glasses and surrounding workers only have to wear clear ones that filter UV.

=== Visible light ===
Photic retinopathy is damage to the macular area of the eye's retina that results from prolonged exposure to sunlight, particularly with dilated pupils. This can happen, for example, while observing a solar eclipse without suitable eye protection. The Sun's radiation creates a photochemical reaction that can result in visual dazzling and a scotoma. The initial lesions and edema will disappear after several weeks, but may leave behind a permanent reduction in visual acuity.

Moderate and high-power lasers are potentially hazardous because they can burn the retina of the eye, or even the skin. To control the risk of injury, various specifications – for example ANSI Z136 in the US, EN 60825-1/A2 in Europe, and IEC 60825 internationally – define "classes" of lasers depending on their power and wavelength. Regulations prescribe required safety measures, such as labeling lasers with specific warnings, and wearing laser safety goggles during operation (see laser safety).

As with its infrared and ultraviolet radiation dangers, welding creates an intense brightness in the visible light spectrum, which may cause temporary flash blindness. Some sources state that there is no minimum safe distance for exposure to these radiation emissions without adequate eye protection.

=== Ultraviolet ===
Sunlight includes sufficient ultraviolet power to cause sunburn within hours of exposure, and the burn severity increases with the duration of exposure. This effect is a response of the skin called erythema, which is caused by a sufficient strong dose of UV-B. The Sun's UV output is divided into UV-A and UV-B: solar UV-A flux is 100 times that of UV-B, but the erythema response is 1,000 times higher for UV-B. This exposure can increase at higher altitudes and when reflected by snow, ice, or sand. The UV-B flux is 2–4 times greater during the middle 4–6 hours of the day, and is not significantly absorbed by cloud cover or up to a meter of water.

Ultraviolet light, specifically UV-B, has been shown to cause cataracts and there is some evidence that sunglasses worn at an early age can slow its development in later life. Most UV light from the sun is filtered out by the atmosphere and consequently airline pilots often have high rates of cataracts because of the increased levels of UV radiation in the upper atmosphere. It is hypothesized that depletion of the ozone layer and a consequent increase in levels of UV light on the ground may increase future rates of cataracts. Note that the lens filters UV light, so if it is removed via surgery, one may be able to see UV light.

Prolonged exposure to ultraviolet radiation from the sun can lead to melanoma and other skin malignancies. Clear evidence establishes ultraviolet radiation, especially the non-ionizing medium wave UVB, as the cause of most non-melanoma skin cancers, which are the most common forms of cancer in the world. UV rays can also cause wrinkles, liver spots, moles, and freckles. In addition to sunlight, other sources include tanning beds, and bright desk lights. Damage is cumulative over one's lifetime, so that permanent effects may not be evident for some time after exposure.

Ultraviolet radiation of wavelengths shorter than 300 nm (actinic rays) can damage the corneal epithelium. This is most commonly the result of exposure to the sun at high altitude, and in areas where shorter wavelengths are readily reflected from bright surfaces, such as snow, water, and sand. UV generated by a welding arc can similarly cause damage to the cornea, known as "arc eye" or welding flash burn, a form of photokeratitis.

ISO 7010 W005 warning sign: Non-ionizing radiation

Fluorescent light bulbs and tubes internally produce ultraviolet light. Normally this is converted to visible light by the phosphor film inside a protective coating. When the film is cracked by mishandling or faulty manufacturing then UV may escape at levels that could cause sunburn or even skin cancer.

== Regulation ==
In the United States, non-ionizing radiation is regulated in the Radiation Control for Health and Safety Act of 1968 and the Occupational Safety and Health Act of 1970. In Canada, various federal acts govern non-ionizing radiation by originating source, such as the Radiation Emitting Devices Act, the Canada Consumer Product Safety Act, and the Radiocommunication Act. For situations not under federal jurisdiction, Canadian provinces individually set regulations around use of non-ionizing radiation.

== See also ==
- Background radiation
- Bioinitiative Report
- Biological effects of radiation on the epigenome
- Central nervous system effects from radiation exposure during spaceflight
- Cosmic ray
- COSMOS cohort study
- Directed energy weapon
- Electromagnetic hypersensitivity
- Electromagnetism
- EMF measurement
- Health threat from cosmic rays
- Light ergonomics
- Magnetobiology
- Microwave
- Wireless device radiation and health
- Personal RF safety monitor
- Specific absorption rate
