= Bioinitiative Report =

Report regarding electromagnetic fields (EMF)

The BioInitiative Report is a report on the relationship between the electromagnetic fields (EMF) associated with powerlines and wireless devices and health. It was self-published online, without peer review, on 31 August 2007, by a group "of 14 scientists, researchers, and public health policy professionals". The BioInitiative Report states that it is an examination of the controversial health risks of electromagnetic fields and radiofrequency radiation. Some updated BioInitiative material was published in a journal in an issue guest-edited by one of the members of the group, and a 2012 version of the report was released on 7 January 2013. It has been heavily criticized by independent and governmental research groups for its lack of balance.

== History ==
In 2006, at the Bioelectromagnetics Society's annual meeting, there was a mini-symposium on electromagnetic fields and radiofrequency radiation to present the science showing biological effects, and the precautionary measures taken by countries around the world. The Bioinitiative Working Group grew out of this conference and decided to write a report on the science and health risks to alert people who could translate the science into public policy. From October 2006 to August 2007, 14 scientists and public health experts, headed by Cindy Sage and David O. Carpenter, worked to come up with recommendations for the Bioinitiative Report.

Since 2007, some material was revised, updated and submitted for peer-reviewed publication and published in the August 2009 issue of Pathophysiology, an issue guest-edited by Martin Blank, one of the three members of the BioInitiative Organizing Committee.

An updated 2012 version of the report was released on 7 January 2013.

== Criticism ==
The following government health authorities and independent expert groups have reviewed the BioInitiative Report and made the following comments on the merit of its claims.

=== Health Council of the Netherlands ===
The Health Council of the Netherlands reviewed the BioInitiative report in September 2008 and concluded it is a selective review of existing research and does not present a balanced analysis considering the relative scientific quality of different studies. Some shortcomings identified included that the report made false claims, as well as claims which lacked scientific basis.

In 2008, they concluded that:

In view of the way the BioInitiative report was compiled, the selective use of scientific data and the other shortcomings mentioned above, the Committee concludes that the BioInitiative report is not an objective and balanced reflection of the current state of scientific knowledge.

=== Australian Centre for Radiofrequency Bioeffects Research (ACRBR) ===
In December 2008 the Australian Centre for Radiofrequency Bioeffects Research (ACRBR) reviewed the BioInitiative Report and concluded:

Overall we think that the BioInitiative Report does not progress science, and would agree with the Health Council of the Netherlands that the BioInitiative Report is "not an objective and balanced reflection of the current state of scientific knowledge". As it stands it merely provides a set of views that are not consistent with the consensus of science, and it does not provide an analysis that is rigorous-enough to raise doubts about the scientific consensus.

The ACRBR also points out there are statements in the report that do not accord with the standard view of science, and the report does not provide a reasonable account of why we should reject the standard view in favour of the views espoused in the report.

The ACRBR also noted that the state of science in this area is continually being debated and updated by a number of expert bodies composed of the leading experts in this field, and strongly urged people to consult these views for a balanced assessment of the research.

=== European Commission's EMF-NET ===
The European Commission's EMF-NET coordination group for investigating the impact of electromagnetic fields on health made the following comments in October 2007 regarding the BioInitiative Report:

There is a lack of balance in the report; no mention is made in fact of reports that do not concur with authors' statements and conclusions. The results and conclusions are very different from those of recent national and international reviews on this topic... If this report were to be believed, EMF would be the cause of a variety of diseases and subjective effects...

=== Institute of Electrical and Electronics Engineers (IEEE) Committee on Man and Radiation (COMAR) ===
The Institute of Electrical and Electronics Engineers (IEEE) Committee on Man and Radiation (COMAR) reviewed the BioInitiative Report in 2009. They concluded:

...that the weight of scientific evidence in the RF bioeffects literature does not support the safety limits recommended by the BioInitiative group. For this reason, COMAR recommends that public health officials continue to base their policies on RF safety limits recommended by established and sanctioned international organizations such as the Institute of Electrical and Electronics Engineers International Committee on Electromagnetic Safety and the International Commission on Non-Ionizing Radiation Protection, which is formally related to the World Health Organization.

=== German Federal Office for Radiation Protection ===
The German Federal Office for Radiation Protection (BfS) commented in October 2007 on a newsmagazine TV show on the German network ARD that featured the BioInitiative Report shortly after its release. They said:

The BfS conducted a preliminary review of the so-called "BioInitiative Report" immediately after its release and concluded that it had clear scientific shortcomings. In particular, it has undertaken to combine the health effects of low- and high-frequency fields that are not technically possible. The overwhelming majority of studies underpinning the report are not new: they already have been taken into account in the determination of currently applicable standards.

=== French Agency for Environmental and Occupational Health Safety ===
The French Agency for Environmental and Occupational Health Safety (Agence française de sécurité sanitaire de l'environnement et du travail, AFSSET) analysed the contents of the BioInitiative Report and in October 2009 said:

...the different chapters of the report are of uneven editing style and quality. Some sections do not present scientific data in a balanced fashion, do not analyze the quality of the articles cited, or reflect the personal opinions of their authors ..., [the report] is tinged with conflicts of interest in several chapters, does not reflect a collective effort, and is written in militant style.

=== Indian Council of Medical Research ===
The Indian Council of Medical Research reviewed the 2012 version of Bioinitiative Report in February 2013 and said:

...on critical examination of the Bio-initiative 2012 Report, has observed that the report is not based on multi disciplinary weight – of evidence method leads to a scientifically sound judgment & objective and there is no balanced reflection of the current state of scientific knowledge. However, the evidence given in the report cannot be ignored and hence, need further investigation in this area.

=== Other ===
In the March/April 2008 newsletter of the Bioelectromagnetics Society, publishers of the journal Bioelectromagnetics and to which several BioInitiative Report contributors belong, a commentary noted "...analysis by good theoretical physicists suggests that nothing is going to happen but the deposition of additional energy that, if sufficient, can elevate tissue temperature. But physicists don't know everything so we turn to the biologists and find that an analysis of the biological database reveals no consistently reproducible (independent) LLNT effect after about 50 or 60 years of research."

== See also ==
- COSMOS cohort study
- Electromagnetic hypersensitivity
- Electromagnetic radiation and health
- Wireless device radiation and health
