= 5G misinformation =

False or misleading information about 5G technology

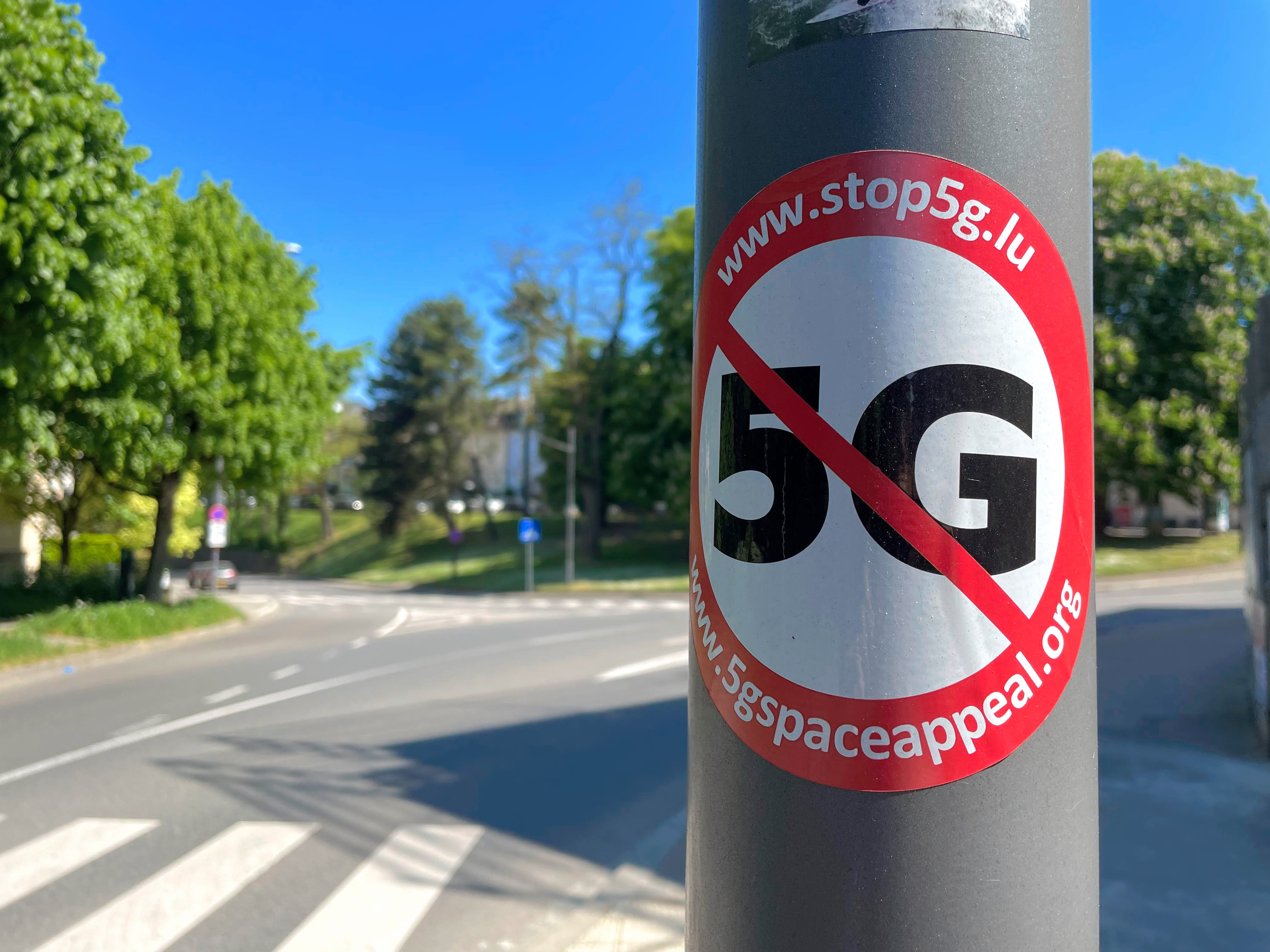
An anti-5G sticker in Luxembourg

Misinformation related to 5G telecommunications technology is widespread in many countries of the world. False information and conspiracy theories has also been propagated by the general public and celebrities. In social media, misinformation related to 5G has been presented as facts, and circulated extensively. There are no scientifically proven adverse health impacts from the exposure to 5G radio frequency radiation with levels below those suggested by the guidelines of regulating bodies, including the International Commission on Non-Ionizing Radiation Protection (ICNIRP). Furthermore, studies have shown that there is no noticeable increase in the everyday radio-frequency electromagnetic exposure since 2012, despite the increased use of communication devices.

== Extent ==
In 2021, a survey conducted in the US polled 1500 adults, asking whether they believed that the US government was using the COVID-19 vaccine to place microchips in the American population. 5% of the survey takers said that this was definitely true and 15% said that it was probably true. Many believed that the 'microchips' would have been controlled via 5G. In a survey conducted among the residents of Nordic countries, 61% replied that they did not know enough about 5G, or how it affects their lives. In 2018, 67% of the Nordic consumers expressed that they would eventually switch to 5G when it became available. In 2020, this figure dropped to 61%, which could be due to misinformation related to 5G. It may also be due to the perceived lack of benefits of 5G over the existing 4G in terms of consumer applications.

One third of British people said in a 2020 survey that they cannot rule out a link between COVID-19 and 5G. Eight percent of the survey takers believed that there is a link between the two, while 19% remained unsure.

A 2020 study that monitored data from Google Trends showed that searches related to coronavirus and 5G started at different times, but peaked in the same week of April 5 in six countries.

Misinformation about the origin of the COVID-19 pandemic, such as its origin is from 5G technology, has been reported to cause higher anxiety in a study conducted in Jordan.

A 2020 study analysing Twitter data related to tweets about 5G and COVID-19 showed that 34% of the tweeters believed in the role of 5G in the COVID-19 outbreak, while 32% denounced or mocked it.

== Popular examples ==
=== Origin ===
Public concern about the effects of wireless signals predates 5G technology. Similar concerns were raised about earlier mobile standards in the 1990s and 2000s. According to the Centers for Disease Control and Prevention (CDC), "exposure to intense, direct amounts of non-ionizing radiation may result in tissue damage due to heat. This is uncommon and mainly a workplace concern for those working with large sources of non-ionizing radiation."

There have been conspiracy theories suggesting that the spread of the SARS-CoV-2 virus from the epicentre of the pandemic in Wuhan, China, is linked to the large number of 5G towers in the city. However, the truth is that 5G technology was not fully deployed in Wuhan as of 2020.

=== Health impact ===
WHO poster warning misinformation related to 5G

Claim	Refutation
5G causes cancer	It is very unlikely that exposure to the 5G radiofrequency will cause cancer. 5G is non-ionizing radiation, and such radiation does not damage DNA. Cancer is generally caused by ionizing radiation, such as gamma rays, that damage DNA.
5G is the cause for COVID-19	Despite the COVID-19 pandemic having started during the deployment of 5G technology, the two are in no way connected. There is indisputable evidence that COVID-19 is a viral disease and has no relationship with 5G or any other cellular technology.
5G weakens the immune system	There is no evidence to suggest that the low levels of radiation emitted by 5G technology can have any effect either on the immune system (including antigens and antibodies).

=== Environmental impact ===
It has been claimed that 5G kills birds or insects, which is false, as radio wave emissions above 10 MHz from cell telephone towers are not known to harm birds. Mass bird deaths that happened in many parts of the world are not related to 5G deployment.

=== Government and industrial surveillance ===
Claim	Refutation
COVID-19 is a cover to embed microchips within COVID-19 vaccine for controlling people via 5G	A microchip with tracking capabilities or 5G functionality would need to be much larger than the bore of a needle, so it would not be possible to inject through a syringe. Indeed, incorporating the size of such a chip would require a syringe with a bore diameter over a dozen times larger than the ones commonly used to deliver the COVID-19 vaccine. Furthermore, the microchip would not function without a power source capable of transmitting a signal through at least an inch of muscle, fat, and skin.
The 5G grid is part of a larger surveillance and artificial intelligence agenda	The fact is that 5G is nothing more than a technology which establishes wireless connections between devices and the internet, with a higher speed and capacity than older technologies such as 4G or 3G. It is only up to the application developers whether to use this wireless connection for any purpose, including surveillance. In that sense, any wireless technology (including 4G or 3G) can also be used for surveillance.
5G maps the insides of bodies and homes	The fact is that 5G is nothing more than a technology which establishes wireless connections between devices and the internet, with a higher speed and capacity than older technologies such as 4G or 3G. It is only up to the application developers whether to use this wireless connection for any purpose, including surveillance. In that sense, any wireless technology (including 4G or 3G) can also be used for surveillance.
5G is a weapons system that governments and industries disguise as new technology	Some people likened the 5G radiofrequency transmitters to the US military's directed-energy weapon called Active Denial System (ADS), which was used to heat the surface of targets, such as the skin of targeted human beings. Although both ADS and 5G use radio waves, 5G transmits over a much lower frequency which is safe for humans. Moreover, 5G transmits at a much lower power than ADS.
5G frequencies are used for crowd dispersal	Some people likened the 5G radiofrequency transmitters to the US military's directed-energy weapon called Active Denial System (ADS), which was used to heat the surface of targets, such as the skin of targeted human beings. Although both ADS and 5G use radio waves, 5G transmits over a much lower frequency which is safe for humans. Moreover, 5G transmits at a much lower power than ADS.
5G replicates inside the body and causes re-radiation	5G radiation is not a biological agent and cannot originate from an organism. Cells can emit some radiation in the form of infrared light, but not radio waves. Such a claim likens 5G to an infectious pathogen such as a virus, as viruses replicate inside the cells of an infected host and can be transmitted between viable hosts through specific routes. Viruses are submicroscopic physical objects and cannot be a form of radiation.

=== Principal concepts ===
It has been assumed that installing new 5G base stations over a given area may result in an uncontrollable increase of radiofrequency "pollution". Contrary to this, dense deployment of 5G base stations is beneficial to the users living in proximity to them because there is no abrupt decrease of radiofrequency compared to sparse deployment.

Installing additional base stations over the area may be needed for supporting an increasing number of users with higher data rates, consequentially shrinking the distance between users and the nearest base station. This is called network densification, which may be wrongly perceived to increase the health impacts of 5G. However, unlike the common perception, network densification can reduce the average electromagnetic field exposure. Lower network densification means that each base station would have to cover a larger area, leading to higher radiated power for each cell.

Dense deployment of 5G base stations also leads to reduced radiation from mobile phones, as connecting base stations are closer to mobile phones. Radiation from base stations is typically lower than radiation from mobile phones, as radiation power follows the inverse-square law, decreasing with the square of distance from the source. Public misunderstanding of these mechanisms may lead to preferences for base stations being located as far away from users as possible. At the same time, it has been demonstrated in a large international survey that the public typically perceive exposure to be higher from a mobile phone held to the ear compared to far-field exposure to multiple base stations, suggesting that people rely on heuristics that often guide them correctly.

== Impact ==
The unsupported health claims have already led to vandalism and burning of some 5G equipment, particularly in the United Kingdom. Unfounded health fears have stalled the network upgrades necessary to reach faster speeds in some cities, while the coronavirus pandemic has slowed sales of 5G-compatible phones.

=== List of protests ===
- In April 2020, arsonists in the U.K. set 5G wireless towers in Birmingham, Liverpool, and Merseyside on fire and then uploaded videos of the vandalism to social media.
- Australian anti-vaxxers protested against 5G technology, large pharmaceutical corporations and COVID-19 vaccines in Melbourne and Sydney.
- Almost 90 attacks against mobile masts were reported during COVID-19 lockdown in the UK. Nearly 50 assaults were recorded against telecom engineers in the UK.
- Seven cell phone towers were burned in Canada by 5G skeptics in May 2020.
- In April 2020, anti-5G protestors in the Netherlands sabotaged and set fire to several 5G towers and sprayed an anti-5G slogan at the scene of an attack. The Dutch government said it reported "various incidents" around broadcasting masts and considered opposition to the 5G rollout as a possible cause, according to a statement on its website. It also warned that attacks targeting 5G network equipment "can have consequences for the coverage of the telecommunications network and reachability of emergency services."
- Global protest of "invisible" people on 16 June 2022. Yellow chairs were set up in public spaces around the world to portray electrohypersensitive people that could not be present. The International EHS Day was initiated by the French EHS in 2018.
- In 2023, protesters in Australia claimed 5G technology would be used to kill and maim people during the Salisbury smart cities controversy.

== Efforts to counter misinformation ==
Many organisations, including the World Health Organization, have created mythbusters and educational material to counter misinformation related to 5G, especially about its effect on health. The Australian Parliament, in its inquiry into 5G technology, has noted that community confidence in 5G has been shaken by extensive misinformation, and government agencies as well as industries have stepped up to provide trustworthy information to the public.

In April 2020, Twitter updated its policy on "unverified claims that incite harmful activity" which could, among other things, lead to the damage of 5G infrastructure. In June 2020, Twitter started placing fact checking labels on tweets about 5G and COVID-19. Facebook has removed several posts with false claims of associations between 5G and COVID-19.

A study authored by doctors Robert R. Brown and Beverly Rubik which concluded that a causal link between the virus and 5G was non-existent was misinterpreted on social media as evidence of a relation between the two.

A 2020 study recommends that denunciation of the 5G and COVID-19 theory from a world leader would have helped in mitigating the spread of misinformation. The study also recommends that the fight against misinformation should ideally happen in the platform where the misinformation is being shared. Appeals from cultural figures with large following on social media can also help reduce misinformation. The general public can stop the spread of misinformation by reporting harmful content as well as by not sharing or engaging with them.
