= Wireless device radiation and health =

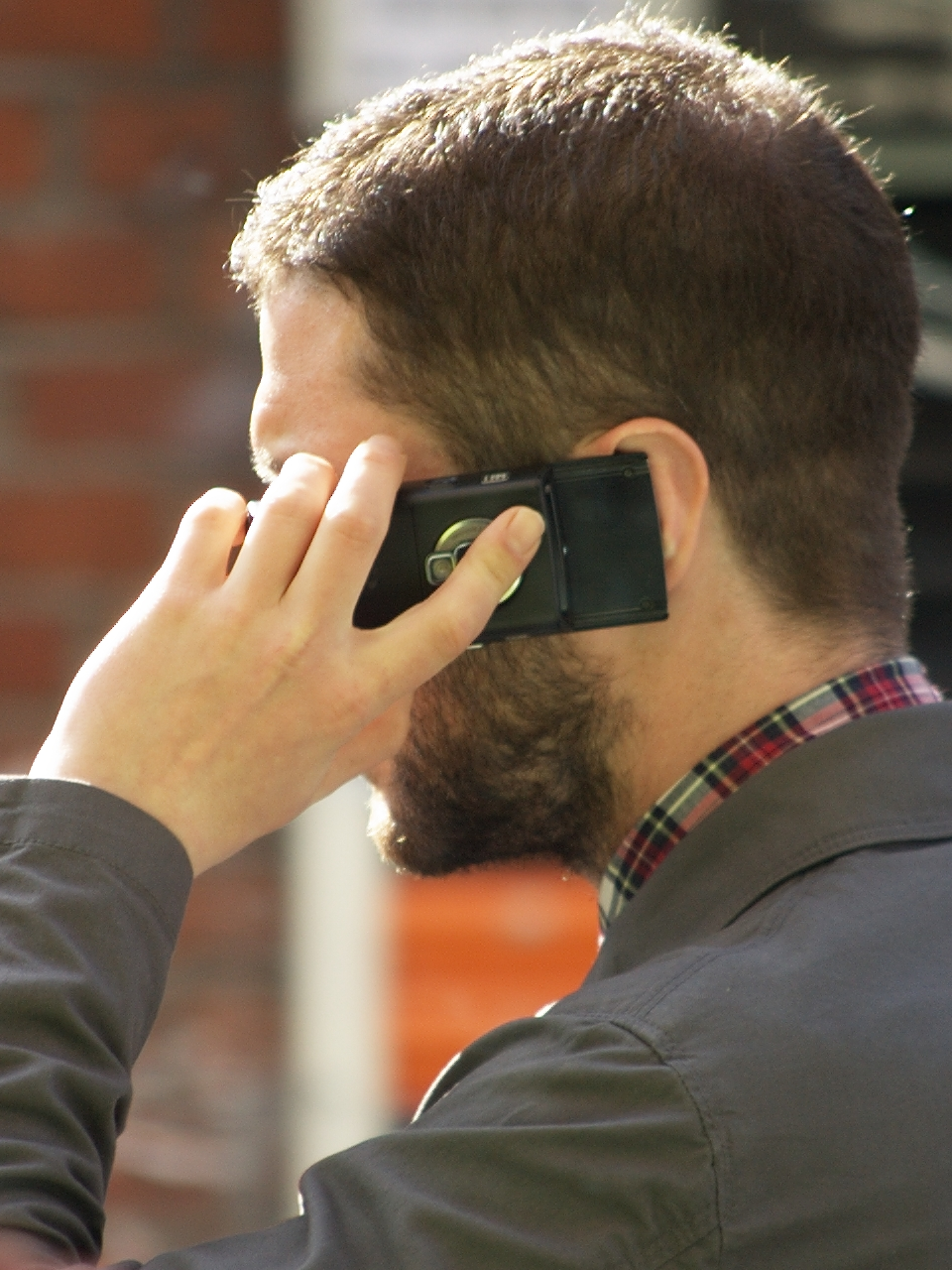
A man speaking on a mobile telephone

The antennas contained in mobile phones, and various other electronic devices, emit radiation which consists of non-ionising radiation or radiofrequency electromagnetic fields (RF EMF) such as microwaves. The parts of the head or body nearest to the antenna can absorb this energy in the form of heat. Since at least the 1990s, scientists have researched whether the now-ubiquitous radiation associated with mobile phone antennas, Wi-Fi routers or cell phone towers is affecting human health. Mobile phone networks use various bands of RF radiation, some of which overlap with the microwave range.

In response to public concern, the World Health Organization (WHO) established the International EMF (Electric and Magnetic Fields) Project in 1996 to assess the scientific evidence of possible health effects of RF EMF with a frequency range from 3 kilohertz (KHz) to 300 gigahertz (GHz). They have conducted a survey in 2019 among 300 radiofrequency scientists to prioritize the most important potential health effects from exposure to radiofrequency electromagnetic fields. The survey reported heat related effects, cancer, infertility, cognitive performance, symptoms and oxidative stress as the most important to study further.

WHO has stated that although extensive research has been conducted into possible health effects of exposure to many parts of the frequency spectrum, all reviews conducted so far have indicated that, as long as exposures are below the limits recommended in the ICNIRP (1998) EMF guidelines, which cover the full frequency range from 0–300 GHz, such exposures do not produce any known adverse health effect. The WHO states that "A large number of studies have been performed over the last two decades to assess whether mobile phones pose a potential health risk. To date, no adverse health effects have been established as being caused by mobile phone use."

In 2024, the National Cancer Institute wrote: "The evidence to date suggests that cell phone use does not cause brain or other kinds of cancer in humans."

In 2011, International Agency for Research on Cancer (IARC), an agency of the WHO, classified wireless radiation as Group 2B – possibly carcinogenic. That means that there "could be some risk" of carcinogenicity, so additional research into the long-term, heavy use of wireless devices needs to be conducted.

International guidelines on exposure levels to microwave frequency EMFs such as ICNIRP limit the power levels of wireless devices and it is uncommon for wireless devices to exceed the guidelines. These guidelines only take into account thermal effects.

The official stance of the British Health Protection Agency (HPA) is that "there is no consistent evidence to date that Wi-Fi and WLANs adversely affect the health of the general population", but also that "it is a sensible precautionary approach ... to keep the situation under ongoing review ...".

In a 2018 statement, the FDA said that "the current safety limits are set to include a 50-fold safety margin from observed effects of Radio-frequency energy exposure".

== Exposure ==
=== Mobile phones ===
A mobile phone connects to the telephone network by radio waves exchanged with a local antenna and automated transceiver called a cellular base station (cell site or cell tower). The service area served by each provider is divided into small geographical areas called cells, and all the phones in a cell communicate with that cell's antenna. Both the phone and the tower have radio transmitters which communicate with each other. Since in a cellular network the same radio channels are reused every few cells, cellular networks use low power transmitters to avoid radio waves from one cell spilling over and interfering with a nearby cell using the same frequencies.

Mobile phones are limited to an effective isotropic radiated power (EIRP) output of 3 watts, and the network continuously adjusts the phone transmitter to the lowest power consistent with good signal quality, reducing it to as low as one milliwatt when near the cell tower. Tower channel transmitters usually have an EIRP power output of around 50 watts. Even when it is not being used, unless it is turned off, a mobile phone periodically emits radio signals on its control channel, to keep contact with its cell tower and for functions like handing off the phone to another tower if the user crosses into another cell. When the user is making a call, the phone transmits a signal on a second channel which carries the user's voice. Existing 2G, 3G, and 4G networks use frequencies in the UHF or low microwave bands, 600 MHz to 3.5 GHz. Many household wireless devices such as WiFi networks, garage door openers, and baby monitors use other frequencies in this same frequency range.

Radio waves decrease rapidly in intensity by the inverse square of distance as they spread out from a transmitting antenna. So the phone transmitter, which is held close to the user's face when talking, is a much greater source of human exposure than the tower transmitter, which is typically at least hundreds of metres away from the user. A user can reduce their exposure by using a wired headset and keeping the phone itself farther away from their body.

Next generation 5G cellular networks, which began deploying in 2019, use higher frequencies in or near the millimetre wave band, 24 to 52 GHz. Millimetre waves are absorbed by atmospheric gases so 5G networks will use smaller cells than previous cellular networks, about the size of a city block. Instead of a cell tower, each cell will use an array of multiple small antennas mounted on existing buildings and utility poles. In general, millimetre waves penetrate less deeply into biological tissue than microwaves, and are mainly absorbed within the first centimetres of the body surface.

=== Cordless phones ===
The HPA also says that due to the mobile phone's adaptive power ability, a DECT cordless phone's radiation could actually exceed the radiation of a mobile phone. The HPA explains that while the DECT cordless phone's radiation has an average output power of 10 mW, it is actually in the form of 100 bursts per second of 250 mW, a strength comparable to some mobile phones.

=== Wireless networking ===
Most wireless LAN equipment is designed to work within predefined standards. Wireless access points are also often close to people, but the drop off in power over distance is fast, following the inverse-square law. However, wireless laptops are typically used close to people. WiFi had been anecdotally linked to electromagnetic hypersensitivity but research into electromagnetic hypersensitivity has found no systematic evidence supporting claims made by affected people.

Users of wireless networking devices are typically exposed for much longer periods than for mobile phones and the strength of wireless devices is not significantly less. Whereas a Universal Mobile Telecommunications System (UMTS) phone can range from 21 dBm (125 mW) for Power Class 4 to 33 dBm (2W) for Power class 1, a wireless router can range from a typical 15 dBm (30 mW) strength to 27 dBm (500 mW) on the high end.

However, wireless routers are typically located significantly farther away from users' heads than a phone the user is handling, resulting in far less exposure overall. The Health Protection Agency (HPA) says that if a person spends one year in a location with a WiFi hot spot, they will receive the same dose of radio waves as if they had made a 20-minute call on a mobile phone.

The HPA's position is that "... radio frequency (RF) exposures from WiFi are likely to be lower than those from mobile phones." It also saw "... no reason why schools and others should not use WiFi equipment." In October 2007, the HPA launched a new "systematic" study into the effects of WiFi networks on behalf of the UK government, in order to calm fears that had appeared in the media in a recent period up to that time. Michael Clark of the HPA says published research on mobile phones and masts does not add up to an indictment of WiFi.

== Health effects of RF ==
=== Heat-related effects ===
There is general consensus that heating caused by RF EMF exposure can lead to heat-related effects such as pain, burns and heat stroke.

=== Cancer ===
There have been rumors that mobile phone use can cause cancer, but this has not been conclusively proven. In 2024, the National Cancer Institute wrote: "The evidence to date suggests that cell phone use does not cause brain or other kinds of cancer in humans."

In a 2018 statement, the US Food and Drug Administration said that "the current safety limits are set to include a 50-fold safety margin from observed effects of radiofrequency energy exposure".

In 2018 the US National Toxicology Program (NTP) published the results of its ten year, $30 million study of the effects of radio frequency radiation on laboratory rodents, which found 'clear evidence' of malignant heart tumors (schwannomas) and 'some evidence' of malignant gliomas and adrenal tumors in male rats. In 2019, the NTP scientists published an article stating that RF scientists found evidence of 'significant' DNA damage in the frontal cortex and hippocampus of male rat brains and the blood cells of female mice. In 2018, the Ramazzini Cancer Research Institute study of cell phone radiation and cancer published its results and conclusion that 'The RI findings on far field exposure to RFR are consistent with and reinforce the results of the NTP study on near field exposure, as both reported an increase in the incidence of tumors of the brain and heart in RFR-exposed Sprague-Dawley rats. These tumors are of the same histotype of those observed in some epidemiological studies on cell phone users. These experimental studies provide sufficient evidence to call for the re-evaluation of IARC conclusions regarding the carcinogenic potential of RFR in humans.'

A 2021 review found "limited" evidence for radio frequencies in the range of 450 MHz to 6,000 MHz to be related to gliomas and acoustic neuromas in humans, however concluding also that "... the evidence is not yet sufficiently strong to establish a direct relationship". The report also states that there is "sufficient evidence" of carcinogenicity in experimental animals from radiofrequency in that same range. Conclusions could not be drawn for higher frequencies (24 to 100 GHz) due to insufficient adequate studies.

=== Fertility and reproduction ===
A decline in male sperm quality has been observed over several decades. Studies on the impact of mobile radiation on male fertility are conflicting, and the effects of the radio frequency electromagnetic radiation (RF-EMR) emitted by these devices on the reproductive systems are currently under active debate. A 2012 review concluded that "together, the results of these studies have shown that RF-EMR decreases sperm count and motility and increases oxidative stress". A 2017 study of 153 men that attended an academic fertility clinic in Boston, Massachusetts found that self-reported mobile phone use was not related to semen quality, and that carrying a mobile phone in the pants pocket was not related to semen quality.

In contrast, a 2021 review concluded 5G radio frequencies in the range of 450 MHz to 6,000 MHz do affect male fertility, possibly affect female fertility, and may have adverse effects on the development of embryos, fetuses and newborns. Conclusions could not be drawn for higher frequencies due to insufficient adequate studies. The magnitude of the effect was not quantified.

=== Cognitive performance ===
Modulation of neurological function is possible using radiation in the range hundreds of GHz up to a few THz at relatively low energies (without significant heating or ionisation) achieving either beneficial or harmful effects. The relevant frequencies for neurological interaction are at or beyond the upper end of what is typically employed for consumer wireless devices and are thus expected to have poor penetration into human tissue. Many of the studies referenced in the review examined rodents rather than humans, thus overcoming the screening typically provided by the thicker skulls of larger mammals.

A 2010 review stated that "The balance of experimental evidence does not support an effect of 'non-thermal' radio frequency fields" on the permeability of the blood–brain barrier, but noted that research on low frequency effects and effects in humans was sparse. A 2012 study of low-frequency radiation on humans found "no evidence for acute effects of short-term mobile phone radiation on cerebral blood flow".

=== Symptoms of electromagnetic hypersensitivity ===
Some users of mobile phones and similar devices have reported feeling various non-specific symptoms during and after use. Studies have failed to link any of these symptoms to electromagnetic exposure. In addition, EHS is not a recognized medical diagnosis.

=== Oxidative stress ===
Oxidative stress is a general mechanism that is assumed to lead to various diseases such as cancer and cardiovascular diseases.

=== Effects on children ===
A report from the Australian Government's Radiation Protection and Nuclear Safety Agency (ARPANSA) in June 2017 noted that:

The 2010 WHO Research Agenda identified a lack of sufficient evidence relating to children and this is still the case. ... Given that no long-term prospective study has looked at this issue to date this research need remains a high priority. For cancer in particular only one completed case-control study involving four European countries has investigated mobile phone use among children or adolescents and risk of brain tumour; showing no association between the two (Aydin et al. 2011). ... Given this paucity of information regarding children using mobile phones and cancer ... more epidemiological studies are needed.

=== Effects on organisms other than humans ===
Low-level EMF does have some effects on other organisms. Vian et al., 2006 finds an effect of microwave on gene expression in plants.

== Base stations ==
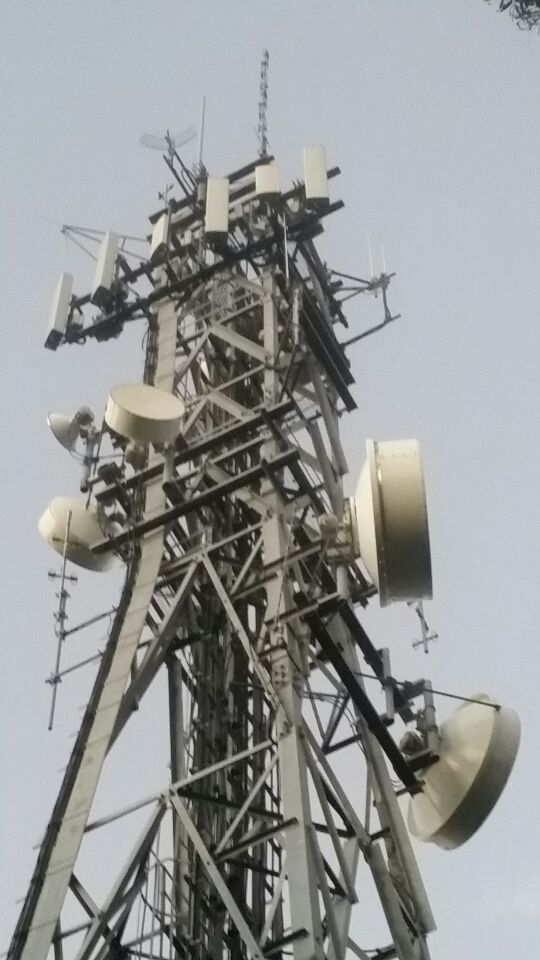
Cellular mobile and UHF antenna tower with multiple antennas

Experts consulted by France considered it was mandatory that the main antenna axis should not to be directly in front of a living place at a distance shorter than 100 metres. This recommendation was modified in 2003 to say that antennas located within a 100-metre radius of primary schools or childcare facilities should be better integrated into the city scape and was not included in a 2005 expert report. The Agence française de sécurité sanitaire environnementale, as of 2009, says that there is no demonstrated short-term effect of electromagnetic fields on health, but that there are open questions for long-term effects, and that it is easy to reduce exposure via technological improvements. A 2020 study in Environmental Research found that "Although direct causation of negative human health effects from RFR from cellular phone base stations has not been finalized, there is already enough medical and scientific evidence to warrant long-term liability concerns for companies deploying cellular phone towers" and thus recommended voluntary setbacks from schools and hospitals.

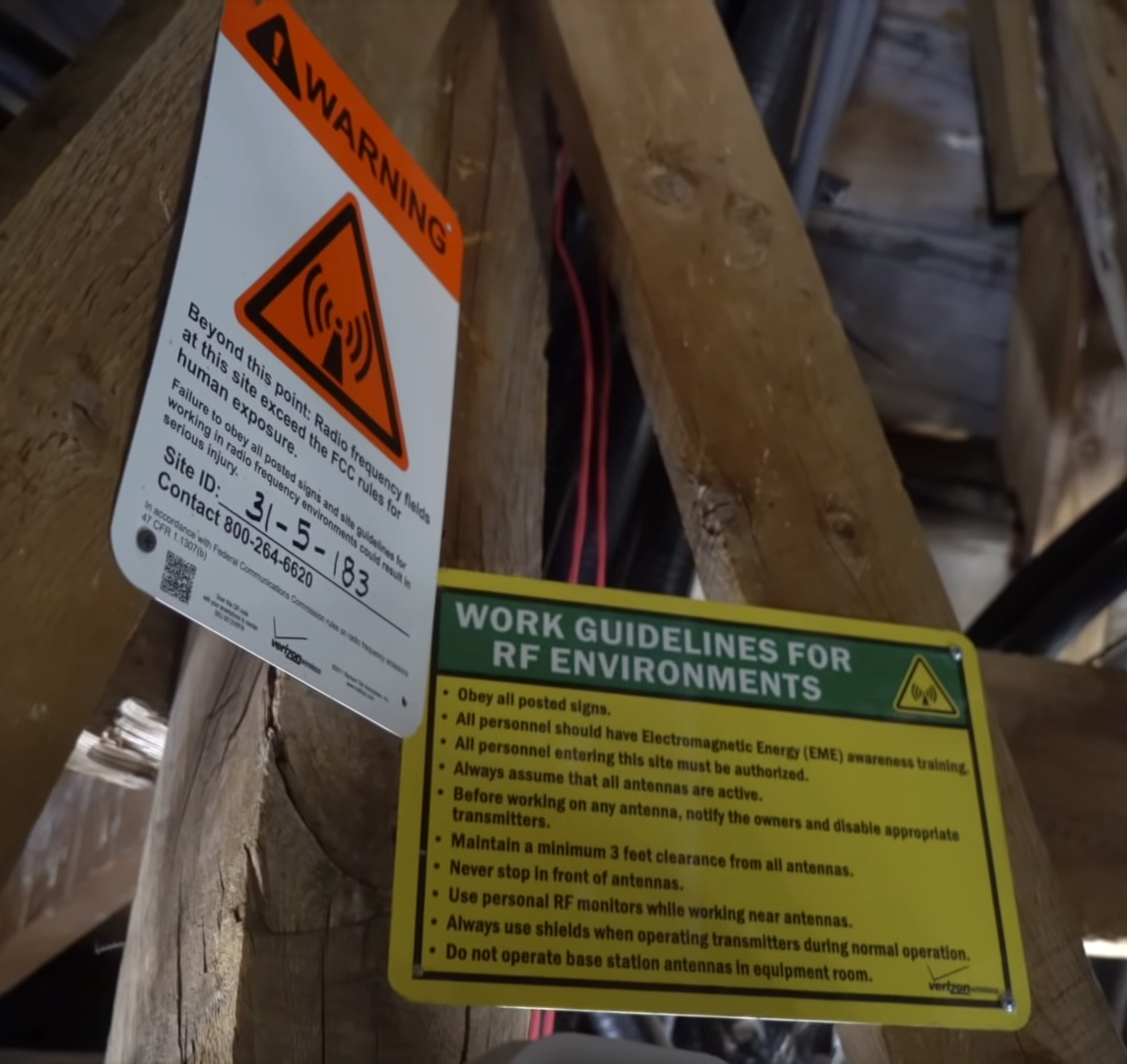
US cell site tower warning sign and work guidelines

== Safety standards and licensing ==
To protect the population living around base stations and users of mobile handsets, governments and regulatory bodies adopt safety standards, which translate to limits on exposure levels below a certain value. There are many proposed national and international standards, but that of the International Commission on Non-Ionizing Radiation Protection (ICNIRP) is the most respected one, and has been adopted so far by more than 80 countries. For radio stations, ICNIRP proposes two safety levels: one for occupational exposure, another one for the general population. Currently there are efforts underway to harmonize the different standards in existence.

Radio base licensing procedures have been established in the majority of urban spaces regulated either at municipal/county, provincial/state or national level. Mobile telephone service providers are, in many regions, required to obtain construction licenses, provide certification of antenna emission levels and assure compliance to ICNIRP standards and/or to other environmental legislation.

Many governmental bodies also require that competing telecommunication companies try to achieve sharing of towers so as to decrease environmental and cosmetic impact. This issue is an influential factor of rejection of installation of new antennas and towers in communities.

The safety standards in the US are set by the Federal Communications Commission (FCC). The FCC has based its standards primarily on those standards established by the National Council on Radiation Protection and Measurements (NCRP) a Congressionally chartered scientific organization located in the WDC area and the Institute of Electrical and Electronics Engineers (IEEE), specifically Subcommittee 4 of the "International Committee on Electromagnetic Safety".

Switzerland has set safety limits lower than the ICNIRP limits for certain "sensitive areas" (classrooms, for example).

In March 2020, for the first time since 1998, ICNIRP updated its guidelines for exposures to frequencies over 6 GHz, including the frequencies used for 5G that are over 6 GHz. The Commission added a restriction on acceptable levels of exposure to the whole body, added a restriction on acceptable levels for brief exposures to small regions of the body, and reduced the maximum amount of exposure permitted over a small region of the body.

== Lawsuits ==
In the US, personal injury lawsuits have been filed by individuals against manufacturers (including Motorola, NEC, Siemens, and Nokia) on the basis of allegations of causation of brain cancer and death. In US federal courts, expert testimony relating to science must be first evaluated by a judge, in a Daubert hearing, to be relevant and valid before it is admissible as evidence. In a 2002 case against Motorola, the plaintiffs alleged that the use of wireless handheld telephones could cause brain cancer and that the use of Motorola phones caused one plaintiff's cancer. The judge ruled that no sufficiently reliable and relevant scientific evidence in support of either general or specific causation was proffered by the plaintiffs, accepted a motion to exclude the testimony of the plaintiffs' experts, and denied a motion to exclude the testimony of the defendants' experts.

Two separate cases in Italy, in 2009 and 2017, resulted in pensions being awarded to plaintiffs who had claimed their benign brain tumors were the result of prolonged mobile phone use in professional tasks, for 5–6 hours a day, which they ruled different from non-professional use.

In the UK Legal Action Against 5G sought a Judicial Review of the government's plan to deploy 5G. If successful, the group was to be represented by Michael Mansfield QC, a prominent British barrister. This application was denied on the basis that the government had demonstrated that 5G was as safe as 4G, and that the applicants had brought their action too late.

== Precautions ==
=== Precautionary principle ===
In 2000, the World Health Organization (WHO) recommended that the precautionary principle could be voluntarily adopted in this case. It follows the recommendations of the European Community for environmental risks.

According to the WHO, the "precautionary principle" is "a risk management policy applied in circumstances with a high degree of scientific uncertainty, reflecting the need to take action for a potentially serious risk without awaiting the results of scientific research." Other less stringent recommended approaches are prudent avoidance principle and as low as reasonably practicable. Although all of these are problematic in application, due to the widespread use and economic importance of wireless telecommunication systems in modern civilization, there is an increased popularity of such measures in the general public, though also evidence that such approaches may increase concern. They involve recommendations such as the minimization of usage, the limitation of use by at-risk population (e.g., children), the adoption of phones and microcells with as low as reasonably practicable levels of radiation, the wider use of hands-free and earphone technologies such as Bluetooth headsets, the adoption of maximal standards of exposure, RF field intensity and distance of base stations antennas from human habitations, and so forth.

=== Precautionary measures and health advisories ===
In May 2011, the World Health Organization's International Agency for Research on Cancer classified electromagnetic fields from mobile phones and other sources as "possibly carcinogenic to humans" and advised the public to adopt safety measures to reduce exposure, like use of hands-free devices or texting.

Some national radiation advisory authorities, including those of Austria, France, Germany, and Sweden, have recommended measures to minimize exposure to their citizens. Examples of the recommendations are:

- Use hands-free to decrease the radiation to the head.
- Keep the mobile phone away from the body.
- Do not use telephone in a car without an external antenna.

The use of "hands-free" was not recommended by the British Consumers' Association in a statement in November 2000, as they believed that exposure was increased. However, measurements for the (then) UK Department of Trade and Industry and others for the French Agence française de sécurité sanitaire environnementale showed substantial reductions. In 2005, Professor Lawrie Challis and others said clipping a ferrite bead onto hands-free kits stops the radio waves travelling up the wire and into the head.

Several nations have advised moderate use of mobile phones for children. An article by Gandhi et al. in 2006 states that children receive higher levels of Specific Absorption Rate (SAR). When 5- and 10-year-olds are compared to adults, they receive about 153% higher SAR levels. Also, with the permittivity of the brain decreasing as one gets older and the higher relative volume of the exposed growing brain in children, radiation penetrates far beyond the mid-brain.

==== 5G ====
The FDA is quoted as saying that it "...continues to believe that the current safety limits for cellphone radiofrequency energy exposure remain acceptable for protecting the public health."

During the COVID-19 pandemic, misinformation circulated claiming that 5G networks contribute to the spread of COVID-19.

=== Bogus products ===
Products have been advertised that claim to shield people from EM radiation from mobile phones; in the US the Federal Trade Commission published a warning that "Scam artists follow the headlines to promote products that play off the news – and prey on concerned people."

According to the FTC, "there is no scientific proof that so-called shields significantly reduce exposure from electromagnetic emissions. Products that block only the earpiece – or another small portion of the phone – are totally ineffective because the entire phone emits electromagnetic waves." Such shields "may interfere with the phone's signal, cause it to draw even more power to communicate with the base station, and possibly emit more radiation." The FTC has enforced false advertising claims against companies that sell such products.

== See also ==
- Electromagnetic radiation and health
- Bioelectromagnetics
- Bioinitiative Report
- COSMOS cohort study
- Microwave News
- Possible health effects of body scanners
- Radiobiology
- Misinformation related to 5G technology
