= Bioelectromagnetics (journal) =

- Discipline: Medicine
- Language: English
- Edited by: James C. Lin

Publication details
- History: 1980–present
- Publisher: Wiley-Liss (United States)
- Frequency: 8/year
- Impact factor: 1.2 (2024)

Standard abbreviations
- ISO 4: Bioelectromagnetics

Indexing
- CODEN: BLCTDO
- ISSN: 0197-8462 (print); 1521-186X (web)
- OCLC no.: 06152871

Links
- Journal homepage

Bioelectromagnetics is a peer-reviewed scientific journal published by Wiley-Liss that specializes in articles about the biological effects from and applications of electromagnetic fields in biology and medicine. It is the official journal of the Bioelectromagnetics Society, the European Bioelectromagnetics Association, and the Society for Physical Regulation in Biology and Medicine.

== Abstracting and indexing ==
The journal is abstracted and indexed in:

- Biological Abstracts
- BIOSIS Previews
- Current Contents/Life Sciences
- EBSCO databases
- Ei Compendex
- Inspec
- ProQuest databases
- Science Citation Index Expanded
- Scopus

According to the Journal Citation Reports, the journal has a 2024 impact factor of 1.2.

== See also ==
- Bioelectrochemistry (journal)
