= Personal RF safety monitor =

Electromagnetic field monitors measure the exposure to electromagnetic radiation in certain ranges of the electromagnetic spectrum. This article concentrates on monitors used in the telecommunication industry, which measure exposure to radio spectrum radiation. Other monitors, like extremely low frequency monitors which measure exposure to radiation from electric power lines, also exist. The major difference between a "Monitor" and a "Dosimeter" is that a Dosimeter can measure the absorbed dose of ionizing radiation, which does not exist for RF Monitors. Monitors are also separated by "RF Monitors" that simply measure fields and "RF Personal Monitors" that are designed to function while mounted on the human body.

== Introduction ==
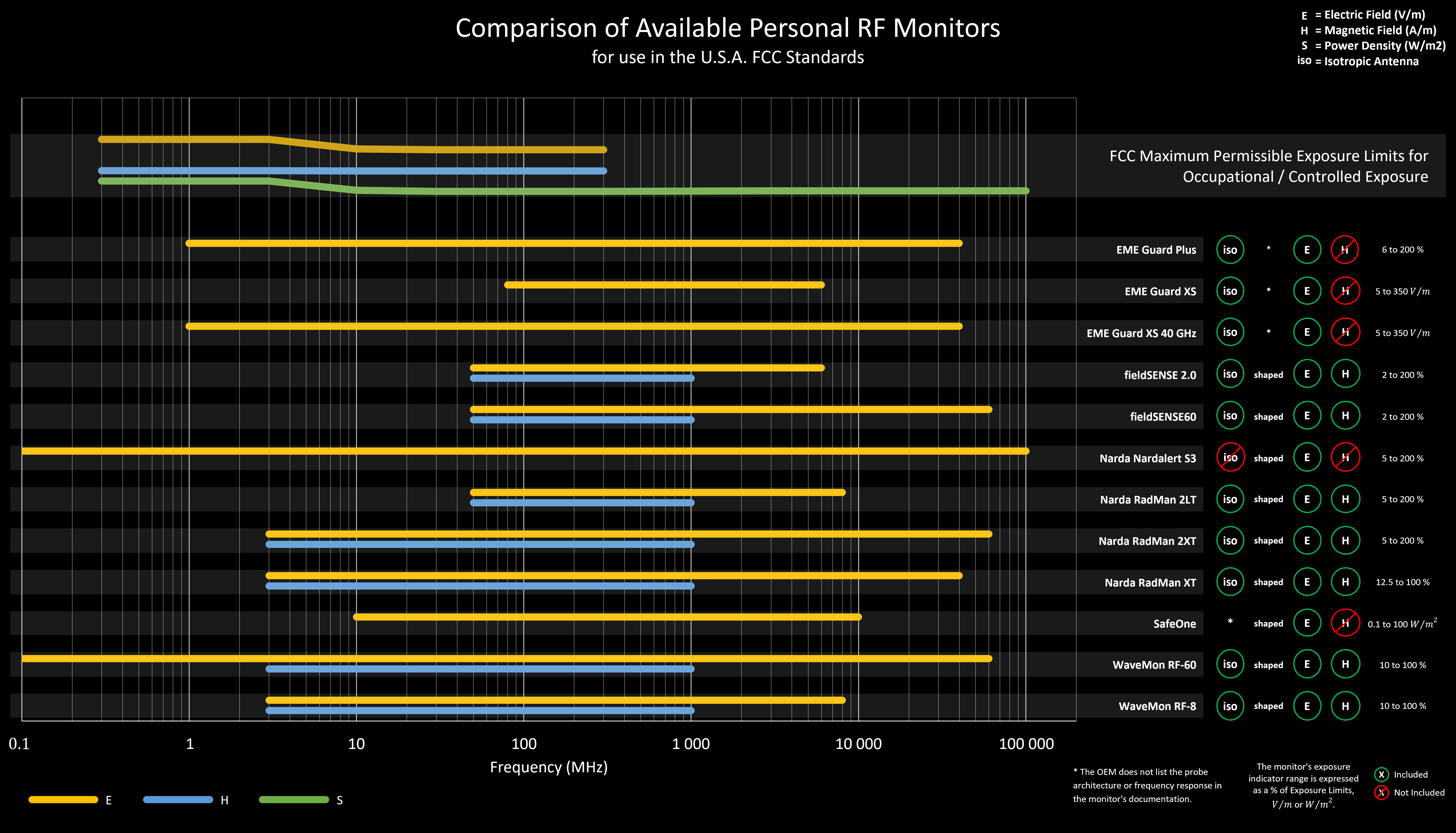
Personal RF monitor comparison

Electromagnetic field monitors, as used in the cellular phone industry, are referred as "personal RF safety monitors", personal protection monitors (PPM) or RF exposimeters. They form part of the personal protective equipment worn by a person working in areas exposed to radio spectrum radiation. A personal RF safety monitor is typically worn either on the torso region of the body or handheld and is required by the occupational safety and health acts of many telecommunication companies.

Most of the scientifically proven RF safety monitors are designed to measure the RF exposure as a percentage of the two most common international RF safety guidelines: International Commission on Non-Ionizing Radiation Protection (ICNIRP) guidelines and the U.S. Federal Communications Commission (FCC). The ICNIRP guidelines are also endorsed by the WHO. RF personal safety monitors were originally designed for RF Engineers working in environments where they could be exposed to high levels of RF energy or be working close to a RF source, for example working at the top of a telecommunication tower, or working on the rooftop of a building where transmitting antennas are present. Most international RF safety programs include the training and use of RF personal safety monitors and the IEEE C95.7 specifies what is a RF Personal Monitor.

In some cases the RF safety monitor comes in a version or mode for the general public. These meters can then be used to determine areas where the public might be exposed to high levels of RF energy or used to indicate the RF level in areas where the general public has access.

== Specification ==
The specifications of a RF monitor determine the work environment where could be applicable. Wideband RF monitors can be used at a broader variety of base station sites than for example a narrowband, cellular RF monitor which is designed only to be used in the mobile telephone- and data networks. IEEE Std C95.3 states that "In the region between 1-100 GHz, resistive thermoelectric dipoles are used as sensors with a background of lossy material to reduce the effect of scattering from the body. Electrically short dipoles with diode detectors as sensors may cover a portion of this range". The results of monitors which do not incorporate "lossy material" to reduce the effects of scattering, are questionable on the body.

The type of response is a basic feature of any RF personal monitor and can be expressed in two basic parameters:

- Directivity: Some of them have an isotropic response, which means that they are able to measure RF fields from any space direction. Others, like radial field monitors, have a partial space coverage, and have to be worn in a specific way in order to provide a correct reading.
- Frequency response:
  - Flat response: units that have a flat response for all the frequency range covered, i.e. the response does not change with frequency.
  - Shaped response: contain frequency dependent sensors that automatically weight the detected RF fields in accordance with frequency-dependent RF exposure limits.

It is common that RF personal monitors provide results as a percentage (%) of frequency-dependent limit values of a specific standard (sometimes called reference levels or MPE, maximum permissible exposure). It is important to be careful interpreting exposure during an alarm condition based on a % result; shaped response RF personal monitors will provide a result as a % of the standard, independently of the frequency, while flat response monitors will provide a result as a % of a particular value (not frequency-dependent), so it is important to know which is the particular value this % is referring to.

Some RF personal monitors have different versions, shaped to each standard, so they will be more accurate, but can be used only for that standard. Others have a single version, so will be less accurate, but can be used for different standards.

Usually, the alarm of most RF personal monitors is triggered by instant values, however, standard limits are specified as time-averaged values. Some RF monitors have the possibility to trigger alarms based on average values, which is a better indication of the real exposure situation (as an example, an instant value can be at 200% while the average being below 100%).

As they are typically small, portable units, they are usually equipped with only a few LEDs for a rough field level indication (50%, 100%, etc). Nevertheless, some of them have a datalogger that allows to download the measurements, check for the exact values, and keep a history record of the exposures. Wavecontrol's WaveMon has available a GPS and altimeter to include position information to the data records.

Other specifications that may be relevant, depending on the application are battery characteristics (lifetime, ways to change or recharge), dimensions, weight, and operating temperature.

The following table shows different basic specifications of some RF monitors:

Specification	EME Guard XS	Narda RadMan XT	Narda RadMan 2LT	Narda RadMan 2XT	WaveMon RF-8	SafeOne	fieldSENSE 2.0	fieldSENSE60	EME Guard Plus	WaveMon RF-60	Nardalert S3	EME Guard XS 40GHz
Frequency Range	80 MHz – 6 GHz	E-Field 1 MHz - 40 GHz (ICNIRP) 3 MHz - 40 GHz (FCC) 10 MHz - 40 GHz (SC6) H-Field 27 MHz - 1 GHz (ICNIRP, SC6) 3 MHz – 1 GHz (FCC)	E-Field 50 MHz – 8 GHz H-Field 50 MHz – 1 GHz	E-Field 900 kHz – 60 GHz (ICNIRP models) 3 MHz – 60 GHz (FCC models) 10 MHz – 60 GHz (SC6 models) H-Field 27 MHz – 1 GHz (ICNIRP, SC6 models) 3 MHz – 1 GHz (FCC models)	E-Field: 300 kHz - 8 GHz H-Field 3 MHz – 1 GHz	10-10000 MHz	E-Field 50 MHz - 6 GHz H-Field 50 MHz – 1 GHz	E-Field 50 MHz - 60 GHz H-Field 50 MHz – 1 GHz	1 MHz- 40 GHz	E-Field: 100 kHz - 60 GHz H-Field: 3 MHz - 1 GHz	100 kHz – 100 GHz	1 MHz – 40 GHz
Directivity	Isotropic (Tri-axial)	Isotropic (Tri-axial)	Isotropic (Tri-axial)	Isotropic (Tri-axial)	Isotropic (Tri-axial)	Isotropic (Tri-axial)	Isotropic (Tri-axial)	Isotropic (Tri-axial)	Isotropic (Tri-axial)	Isotropic (Tri-axial)	Radial and Dual-polarized	Isotropic (Tri-axial)
Frequency Response	Flat	Shaped	Shaped	Shaped	Shaped	Flat	Shaped	Shaped	Flat	Shaped	Shaped	Flat
50/60 Hz immunity	N/A	1 kV/m	10 kV/m	10 kV/m	30 kV/m	N/A	N/A	N/A	N/A	30 kV/m	100 kV/m	N/A
Designed to be worn on the Body (per IEEE C95.3)	No	Yes	Yes	Yes	Yes	No	Yes	Yes	No	Yes	Yes	No
Reference standard	ICNIRP 2020 FCC Safety Code 6 2015 User-definable 2004/40/EC	ICNIRP FCC Safety Code 6 ICNIRP General Public (separate model)	ICNIRP FCC Safety Code 6 ICNIRP General Public (separate model)	ICNIRP ICNIRP General Public FCC Safety Code 6	FCC EU Directive (2013/35/EU) ICNIRP Safety Code 6 (2015)	ICNIRP FCC IEEE NCRP Safety Code 6	ICNIRP FCC (NCRP) IEEE Safety Code 6 EU Directive	ICNIRP FCC (NCRP) IEEE Safety Code 6 EU Directive	ICNIRP 2020 FCC Safety Code 6 2015 User-definable	FCC EU Directive (2013/35/EU) ICNIRP Safety Code 6 (2015) NATO	FCC IEEE C95.1 Safety Code 6 (2015) ICNIRP	ICNIRP 2020 FCC 96-326 Safety Code 6 2015 2013/35/UE
Exposure level indicators	1 X LED => 1% 2 X LED => 5% 3 X LED => 20% 4 X LED => 100% 5 X LED => 225% 6 X LED => 500% 7 X LED => 2000% (Broadcast 100 MHz: Visual & Audio Alarms Activated 5 to 350 V/m User-definable at factory)	1 X LED => 12.5% 2 X LED => 25% 3 X LED => 50% (Buzzer alarm) 4 X LED => 100% (Buzzer alarm)	1 X LED => 5% 2 X LED => 10% 3 X LED => 25% 4 X LED => 50% 5 X LED => 100% 6 X LED => 200% => 50%: visual, audible and vibration indicators => 100%: strong visual, audible and vibration indicators	1 X LED => 5% 2 X LED => 10% 3 X LED => 25% 4 X LED => 50% 5 X LED => 100% 6 X LED => 200% => 50%: visual, audible and vibration indicators => 100%: strong visual, audible and vibration indicators	1 X LED => 10% 2 X LED => 25% 3 X LED => 50% 4 X LED => 75% 5 X LED => 100% 6 X LED => 200% Visual, Audio & Vibration Alarms. Adjustable by user.		1 X LED => 2% 2 X LED => 5% 3 X LED => 10% 4 X LED => 25% 5 X LED => 50% (0.75 Hz buzzer alarm) 6 X LED => 100% (1.5 Hz buzzer alarm) 7 X LED => 200% (3 Hz buzzer alarm)	1 X LED => 2% 2 X LED => 5% 3 X LED => 10% 4 X LED => 25% 5 X LED => 50% (0.75 Hz buzzer alarm) 6 X LED => 100% (1.5 Hz buzzer alarm) 7 X LED => 200% (3 Hz buzzer alarm)	1 x LED=> 6% 2 x LED=> 12% 3 x LED=> 25% 4 x LED=> 50% 5 x LED=> 100% 6 x LED=> 200% (Visual, Audio and Vibration alarms adjustable )	1 X LED => 10% 2 X LED => 25% 3 X LED => 50% 4 X LED => 75% 5 X LED => 100% 6 X LED => 200% Visual, Audio & Vibration Alarms. Adjustable by user.	LED Display of the Actual Value Two LED Alarm Indicators (Visual) Two Audio Alarm Indicators Vibration Alarm Indicator User Variable in 50% increments Defaults are 50 and 200%	1 X LED => 0.4% 2 X LED => 2% 3 X LED => 10% 4 X LED => 40% 5 X LED => 100% 6 X LED => 200% 7 X LED => 800%
Data logger	No	Yes	Yes	Yes	Yes	No	Yes	Yes	Yes	Yes	Yes (Option)	No
GPS	No	No	No	No	Yes	No	No	No	No	Yes	No	No
Altimeter	No	No	No	No	Yes	No	No	No	No	Yes	No	No
Battery life	>100 hours	200 hours	800 hours (Rechargeable via USB)	800 hours (Rechargeable via USB)	>200 hours (Rechargeable via USB)	2,000 hours	6-12 months average use	6-12 months average use	Recording mode: >300 hours Non-recording mode: >3 months (8 hours/day)	>200 hours (Rechargeable via USB)	25 hours (Rechargeable via USB)	> 1000 hours
Dimensions	132.5 x 48.5 x 28.7 mm	163 x 41 x 37 mm	165 x 47 x 31 mm	165 x 47 x 31 mm	174 x 42.5 x 33 mm	58 x 105 x 23 mm	146 X 42 X 26 mm	146 X 42 X 26 mm	172.6 X 59 X 35.5 mm	174 x 42.5 x 33 mm	117 x 83 x 32 mm	132.5 x 48.5 x 28.7 mm ( LxWxH)
Weight	120g	130g	185g	185g	190g	88g	115 g	115 g	275g	190g	230g	120 g
Operating temperature	-10°C to +50°C	-10°C to + 55°C	-10°C to + 55°C	-10°C to + 55°C	-20 °C to +50 °C	-10°C to +40°C	-20 °C to +50 °C	-20 °C to +50 °C	-20°C to +55°C	-20 °C to +50 °C	-10°C to +50°C	-10°C to +50°C
Calibration interval	24 Months	36 months	36 months	36 months	24 Months	24 Months	36 Months	36 Months	24 Months	24 Months	48 months	24 Months
NIST/ILAC Traceable Calibration	No	Yes	Yes	Yes	Yes	No	Yes	Yes	No	Yes	Yes	No
Fall Detection Alarm	No	No	No	No	Yes	No	Yes	Yes	No	Yes	No	No
Approx. price USD	$550	$1000	$600	$1200	$900	$700	$599	$799	$999	$1400	$1700	$799

== Operating instructions ==
Each specific personal RF safety monitor has its own operating instructions. And most of the monitors have different operating modes. For instance, the Narda Radman has a mode in which it can be body worn by the operator, but it also has a probe mode where the operator can scan certain areas to find accurate exclusion zones. The FieldSENSE on the other hand has a monitor and measure mode. The measure mode is similar to the Radman's probe mode, but the monitor mode is used by mounting the FieldSENSE onto an inactive antenna and then it is safe to work on the antenna until the FieldSENSE raise an alarm to warn RF technicians that the antenna is live and that any work on the antennas should be ceased until deactivation is confirmed. The Wavecontrol's WaveMon and Narda's RadMan 2[29] can be body-worn, and used off the body as a probe or as a monitor. Most of the RF monitors such as the FieldSENSE, EME Guard, WaveMon and the RadMan 2 also have a data logging functionality that can log the RF exposure of a worker over time. The RadMan 2XT's RF detection mode with its tone search feature can locate leaks in waveguides and verify that an antenna is turned off. [30]

== List of personal RF monitors ==
- EME Guard Plus
- EME Guard XS
- EME Guard XS 40 GHz
- EME SPY Evolution
- Narda Radman XT
- Narda RadMan 2LT
- Narda RadMan 2XT
- Nardalert S3
- FieldSENSE60
- FieldSENSE 2.0
- Public FieldSENSE
- SafeOne Pro SI-1100XT
- WaveMon RF-8
- WaveMon RF-60

== Gallery ==
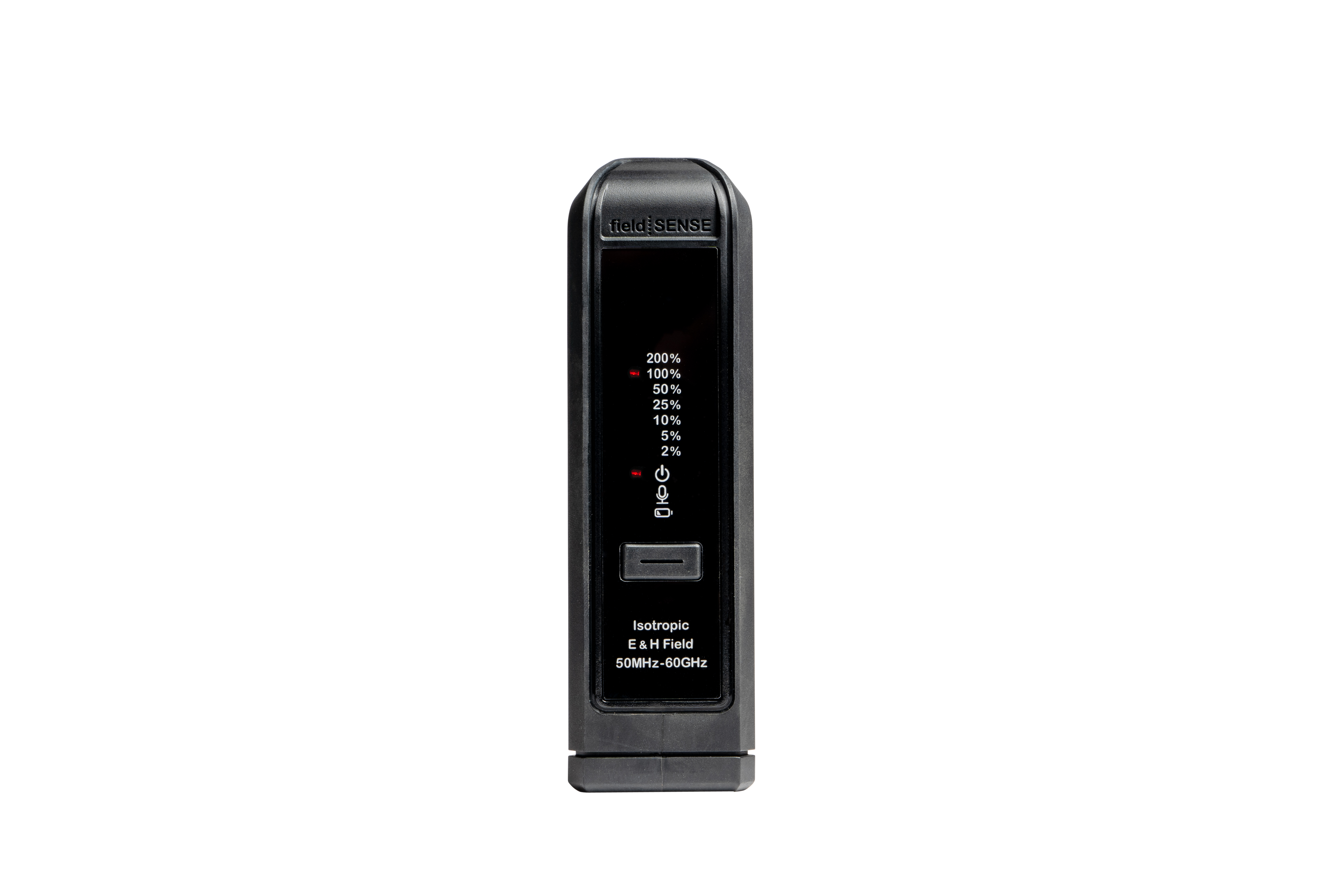
FieldSENSE60

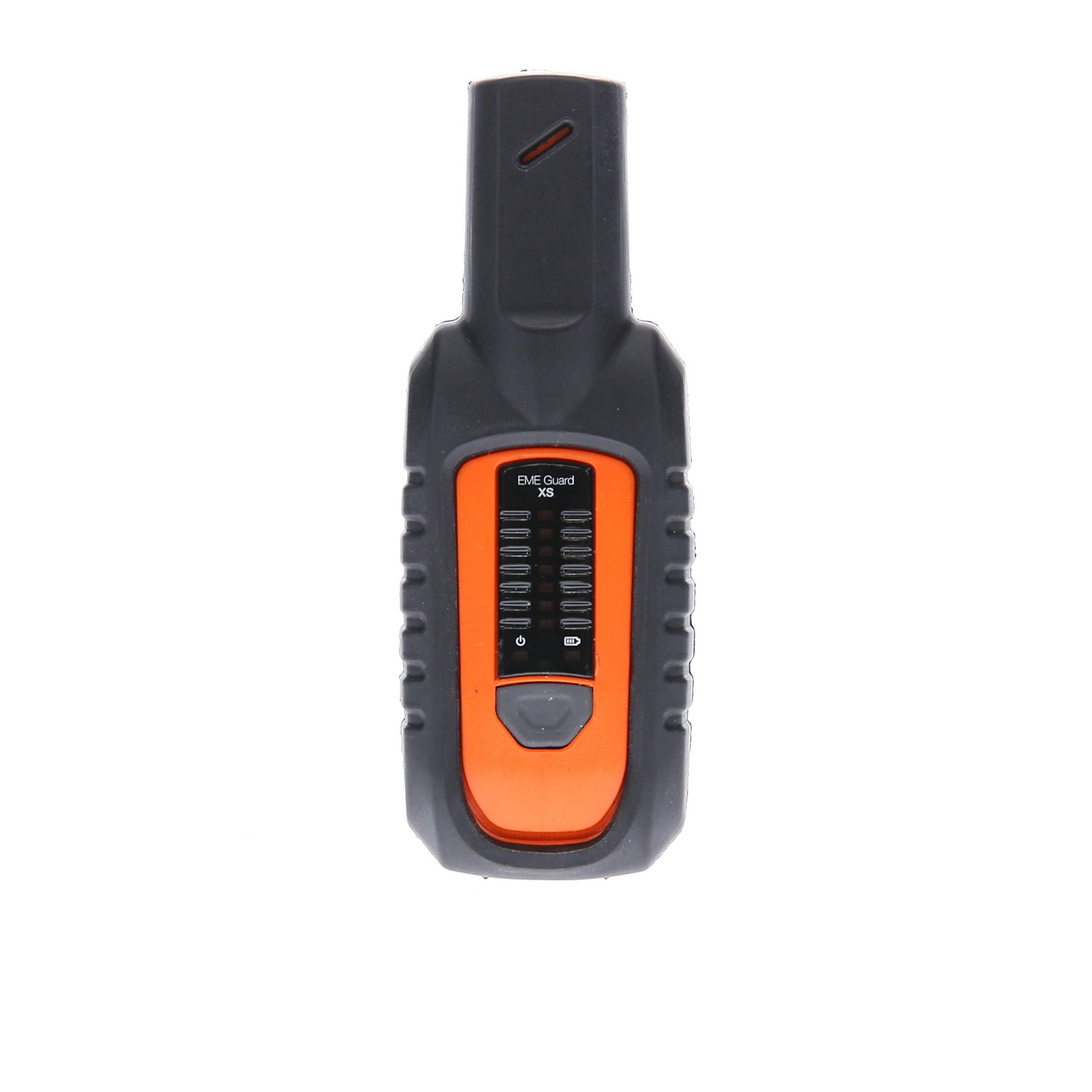
MVG - EME Guard XS 40 GHz.jpg

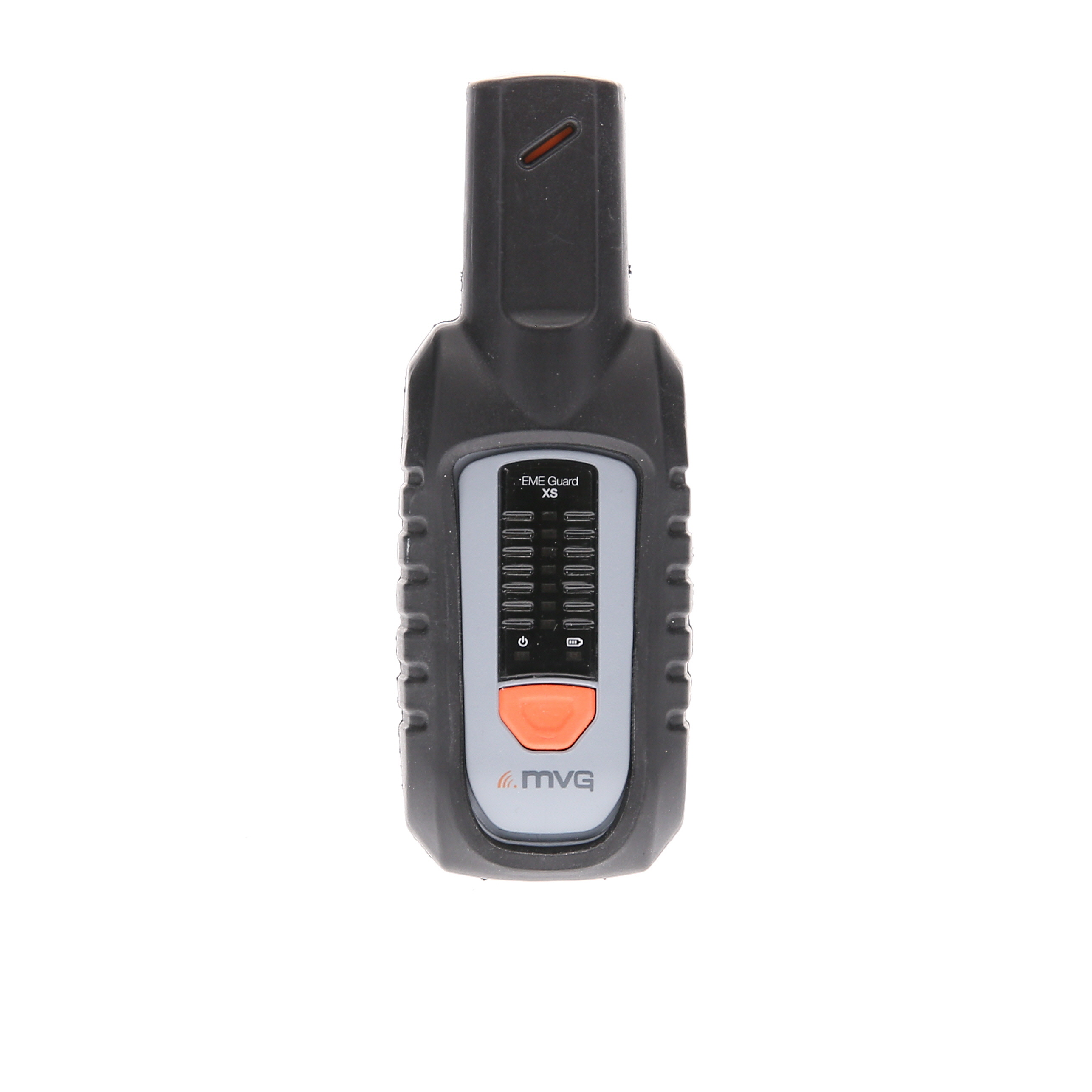
MVG - EME Guard XS.jpg

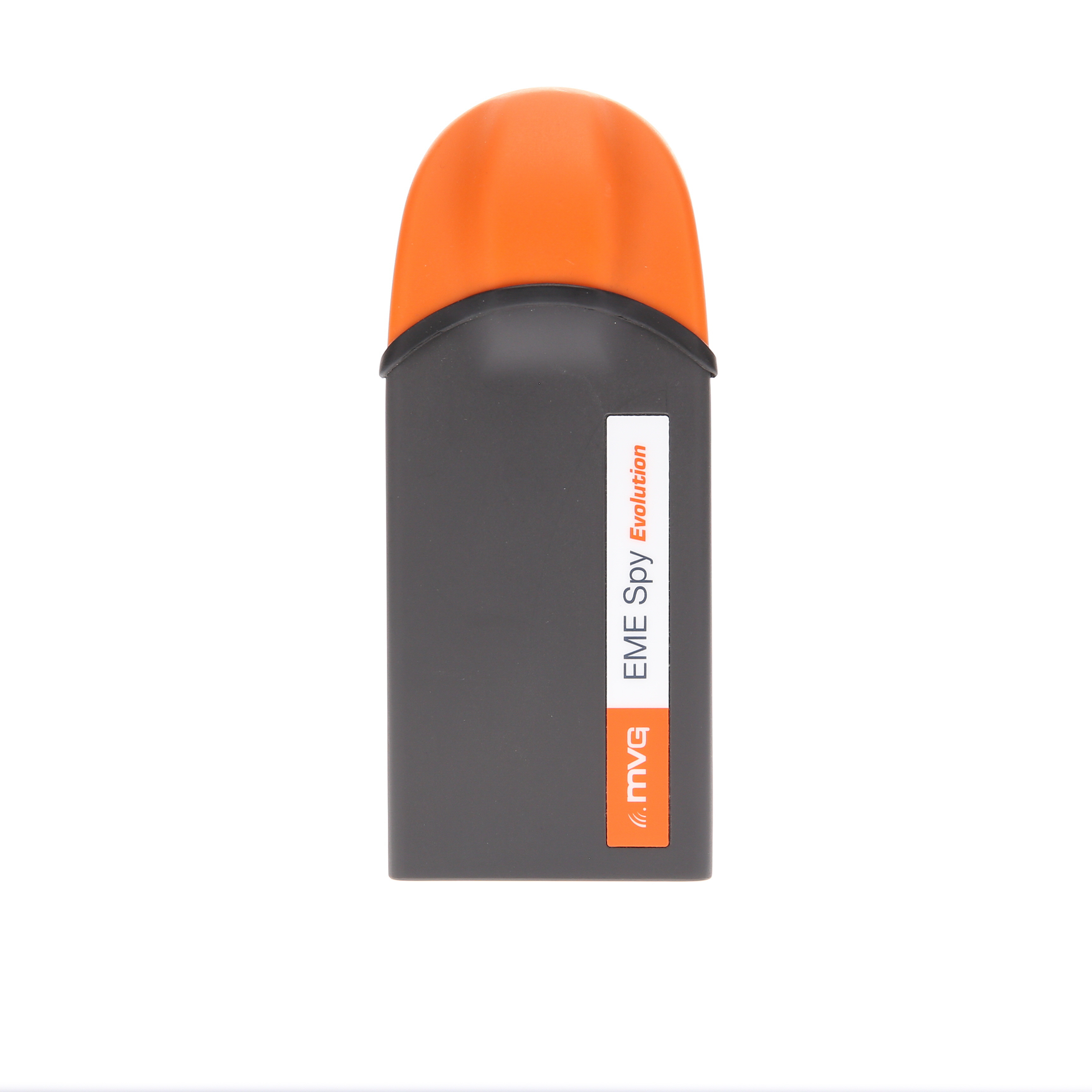
MVG-EME Spy Evolution

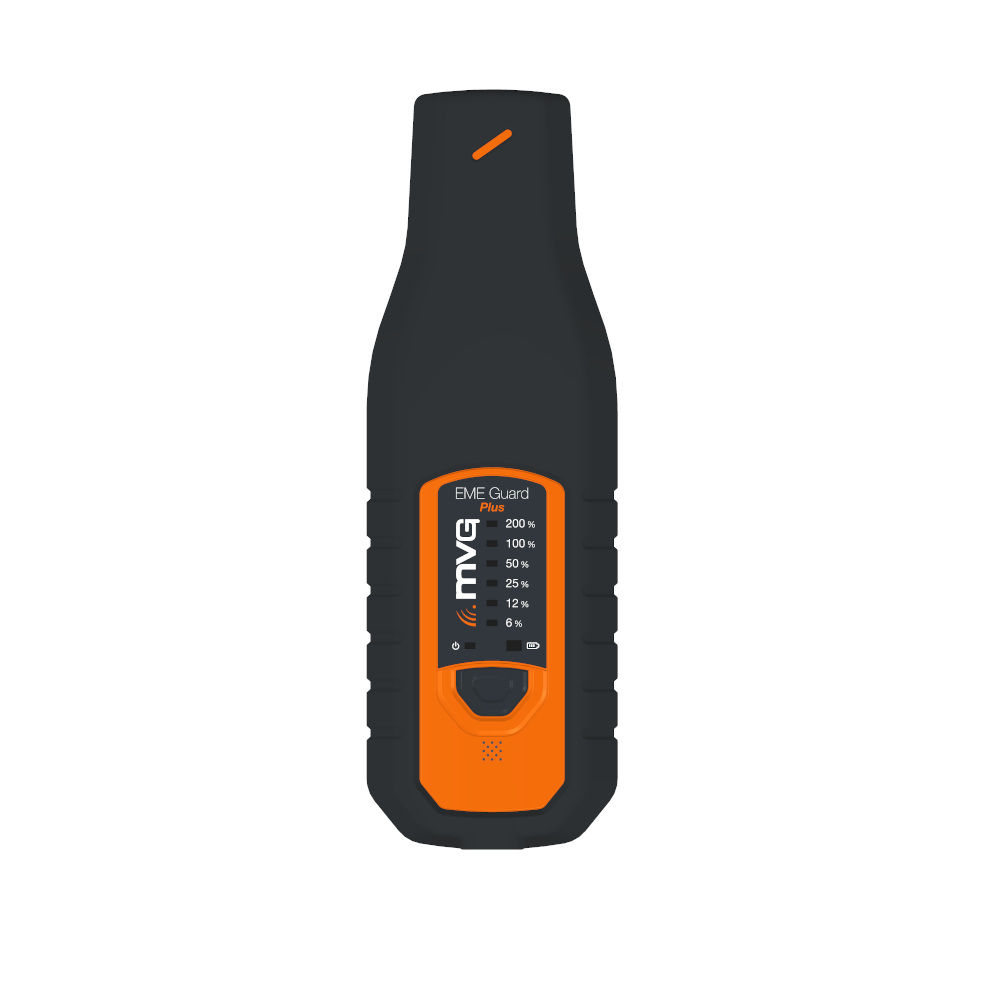
MVG EME Guard Plus

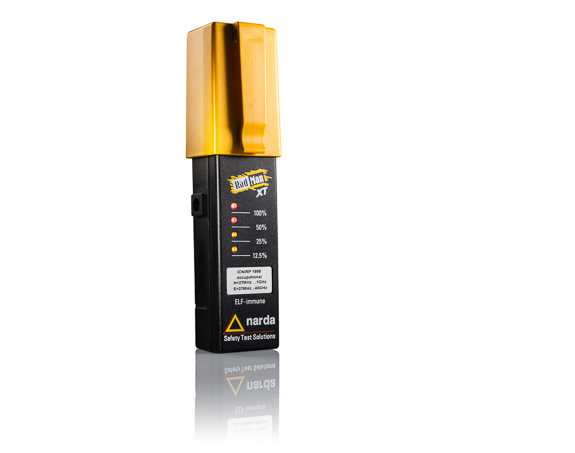
Narda RadMan XT

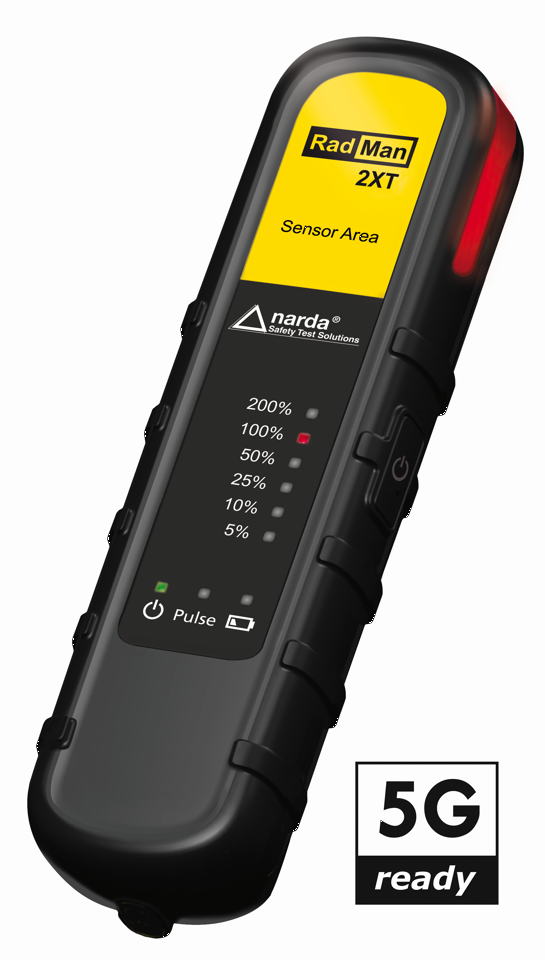
Narda RadMan 2XT

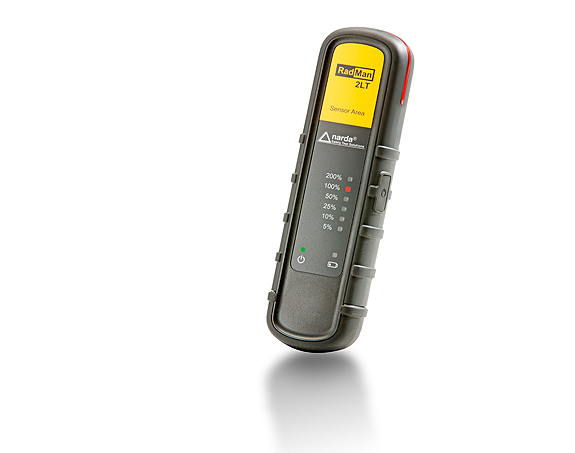
Narda RadMan 2LT

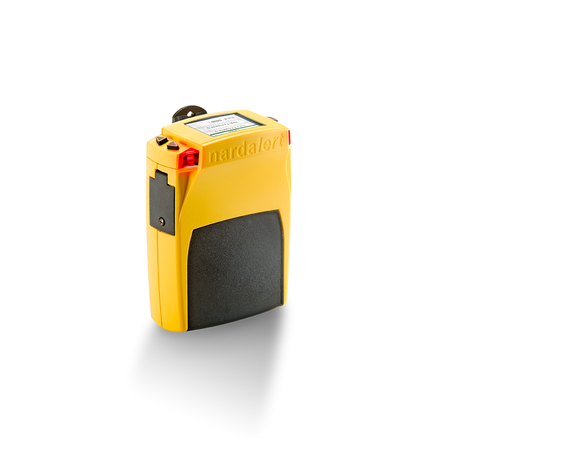
Nardalert S3

WaveMon RF-8 Personal RF monitor

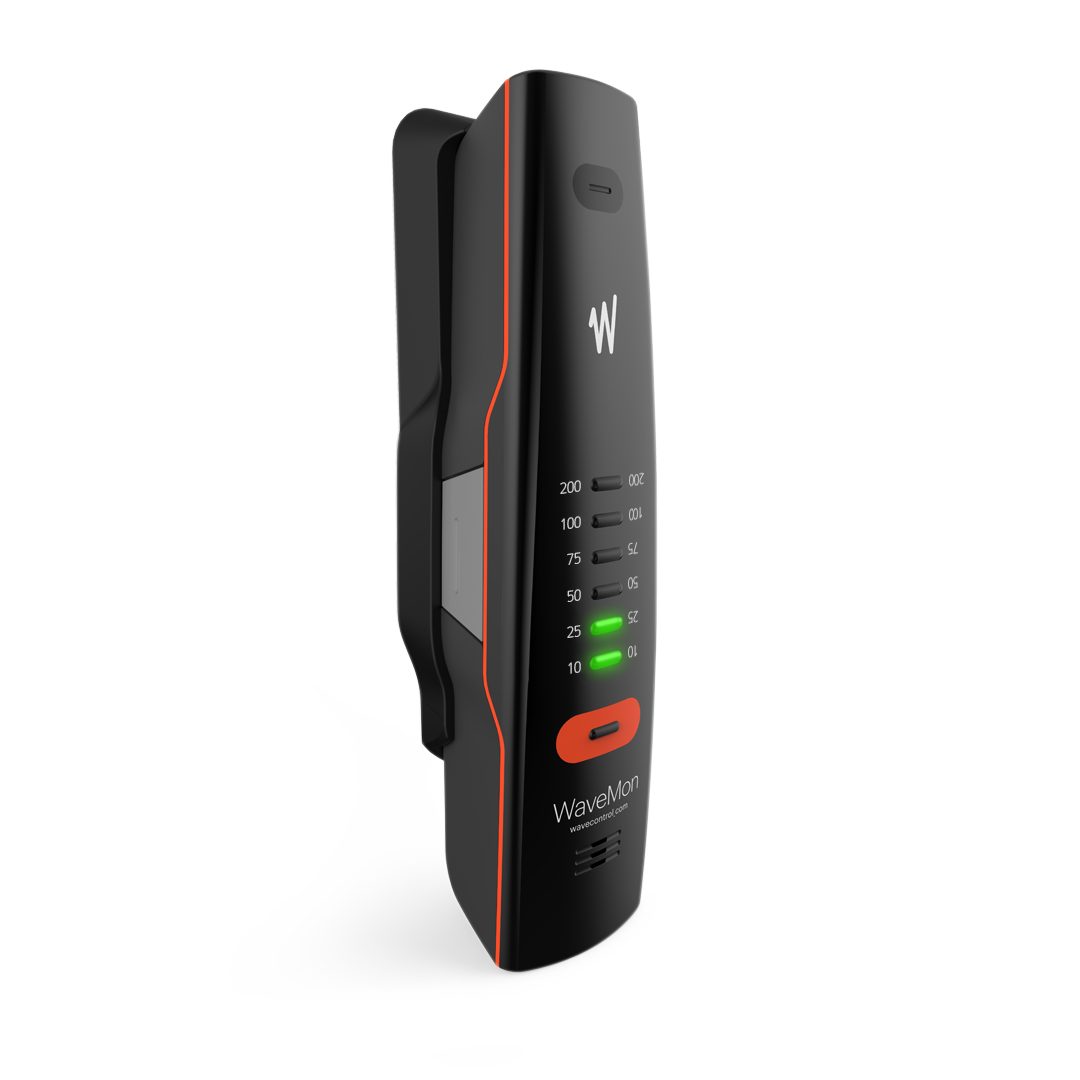
WaveMon RF-60 Personal RF monitor
