= Radiological hazard =

Radiological hazard may refer to:

- Ionizing radiation § Health effects
- Radioactive contamination
- Radiation damage
- Radiation poisoning
- Depleted uranium § Radiological hazards

== See also ==
- International Nuclear Event Scale
