= Bioelectrochemistry (journal) =

Journal

- Discipline: Biochemistry, biophysics
- Language: English
- Edited by: P. Vadgama

Publication details
- History: 2000–present
- Publisher: Elsevier
- Frequency: Weekly
- Impact factor: 5.373 (2020)

Standard abbreviations
- ISO 4: Bioelectrochemistry

Indexing
- ISSN: 1567-5394

Links
- Journal homepage

Bioelectrochemistry is a bimonthly peer-reviewed scientific journal covering research on the electrochemistry of biological systems. The current editor-in-chief is E. Neumann (Bielefeld University). It was established in 1974 as Bioelectrochemistry and Bioenergetics (ISSN 0302-4598) and obtained its current title in 2000.

== Impact factor ==
According to the Journal Citation Reports, the journal has a 2020 impact factor of 5.373.
