= Glassblower's cataract =

Form of cataract due to an occupational exposure

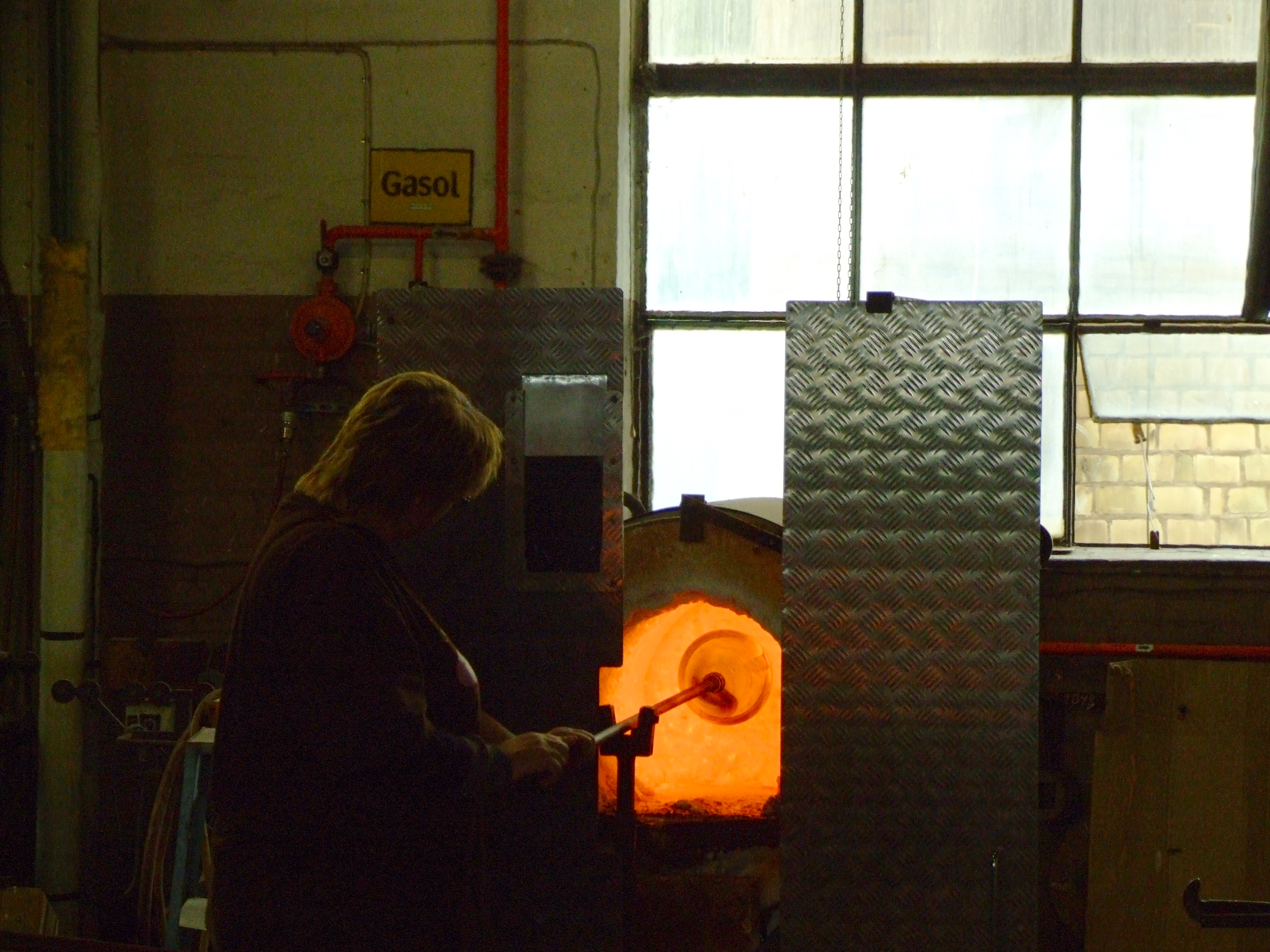
A person glassblowing.

Glassblower's cataracts are a form of cataract due to an occupational exposure. They are formed by many years or decades of exposure to infrared radiation while working in the occupation of glass blowing, or working close to hot or molten metals such with metal foundry workers or blacksmiths. Glassblower's cataracts are due to chronic exposure to infrared radiation emitted due to the extreme heating of glass or molten metal. The infrared radiation is absorbed by the iris and lens of the eye. This causes cataracts after decades of exposure. This condition may be prevented by wearing protective glasses while practicing these occupations.

== Symptoms and signs ==
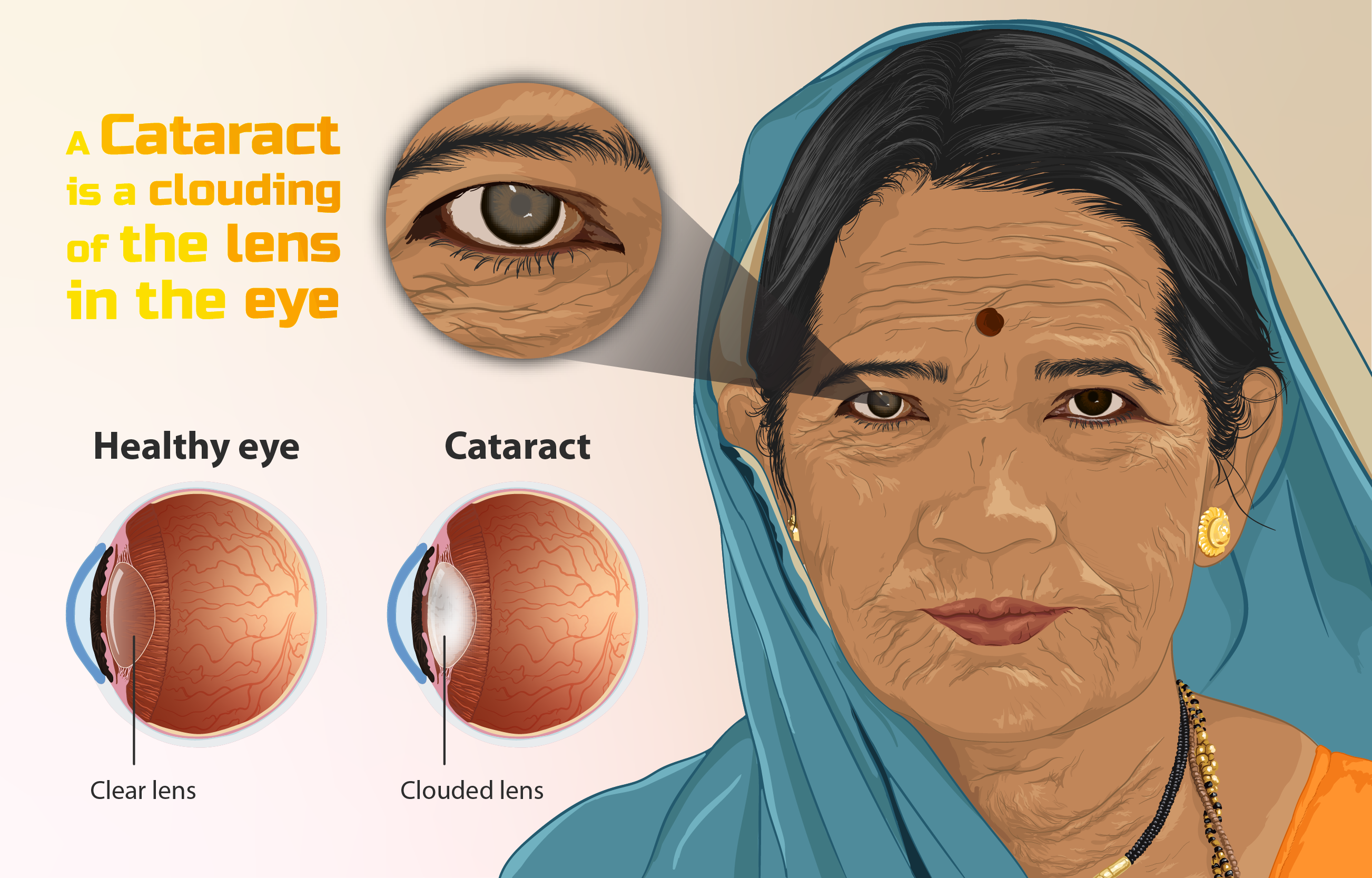
Comparison between a healthy eye versus one with a Cataract.

As with cataracts not associated with glassblowing, symptoms typically have a gradual onset. Initially, people generally are unaware they have cataracts. Blurry vision is one of the first symptoms to appear which gradually worsens as the cataracts develop further. Colors may eventually become more and more faded, eyes will become more sensitive to light, and sometimes people will have trouble seeing at nighttime. Double vision can occur and the need to change prescriptions often are also common symptoms. Over time, vision loss can occur in people who have well-developed, untreated cataracts.

== Mechanism ==
Glassblowers tend to work with very high-temperature objects and equipment, which emit a great deal of infrared radiation through black-body radiation. The ocular lens, like all matter, has the capacity to store incident photon energy by resonance absorption. Absorption of infrared photons increases vibration of molecules, which is observed as increased temperature. Large important biomolecules such as proteins tend to lose their space structure when vibrating, known as denaturation. The rate of protein denaturation is temperature dependent as described by the Arrhenius equation. Damage to biological tissue owing to the high rate of vibration damage is called thermal damage. Prior to recent research, it was theorized that one possible mechanism was the large intake of fluid due to excessive sweating on the job. Within this theory, it was suggested that the evaporation of the sweat within the cornea "could lead to increased concentration of the aqueous humour," this increase could therefore induce the cataract. This however has not been proven to be true and instead it is generally accepted that the infrared photons as mentioned above are the primary cause of glassblower's cataracts.

== Diagnosis ==
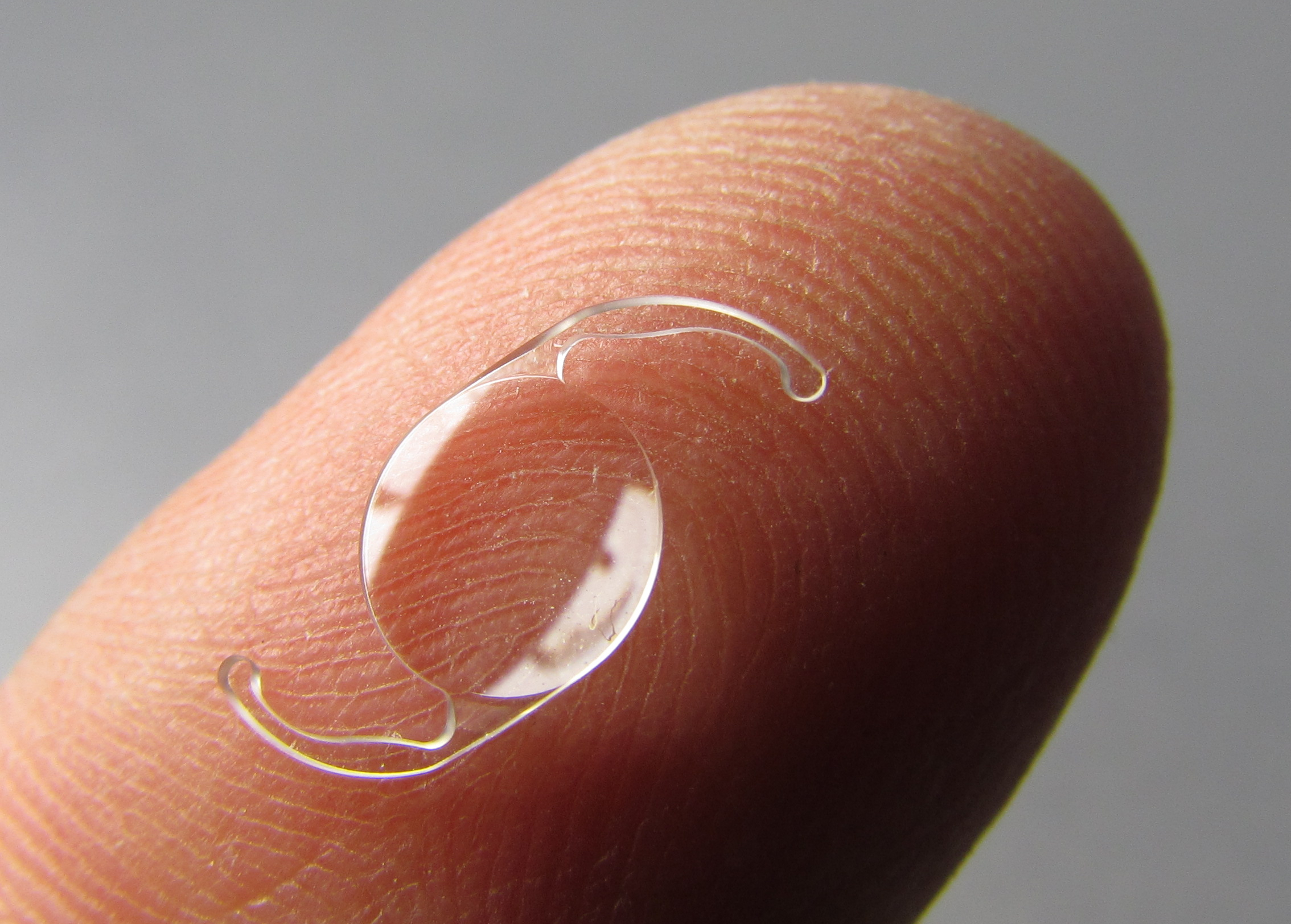
A posterior chamber intraocular lens prior to insertion. This is inserted during cataract surgery after the cloudy eye's natural lens is removed.

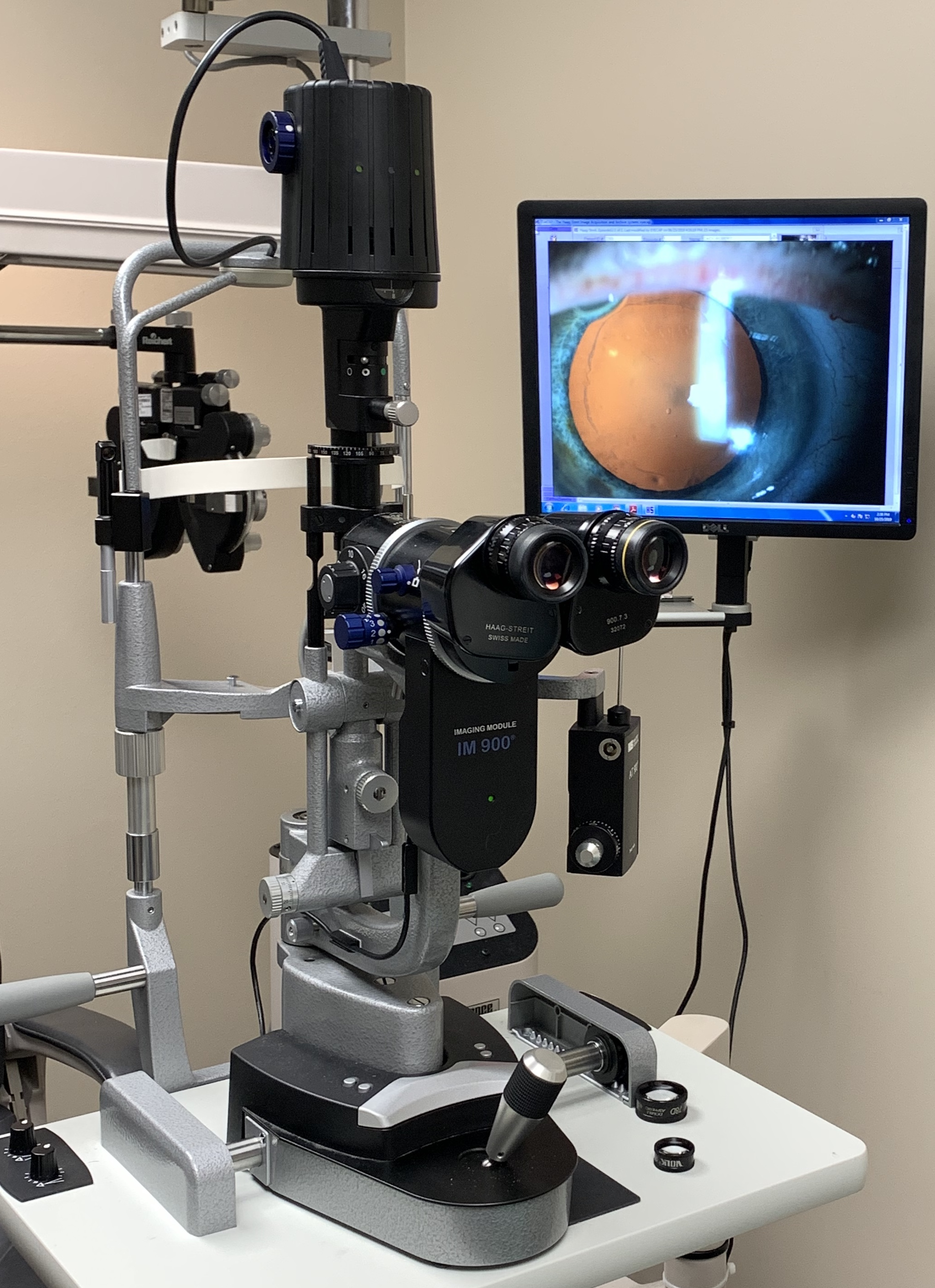
Pictured here is a slit lamp. When used with a binocular microscope, the ophthalmologist can examine the eye with a small beam (slit) of light. The slit of light can accentuate features of the eye when directed at an angle. The microscope used in combination with the slit lamp allows for greater magnification (10 - 25 times) than typical handheld devices.

Like symptoms, glassblowers cataracts can also be diagnosed the same way as cataracts not associated with glassblowing. To diagnose cataracts, a comprehensive eye exam must be done. This exam will include dilation to measure the response of the pupils. A slit lamp examination will also be conducted to examine the cornea, iris, and other areas closer to the front of the eye. A slit lamp is used because it makes it easier for ophthalmologists to spot abnormalities. When the eye is dilated, the pupils widen so that the ophthalmologist can see the back of the eye more clearly. The ophthalmologist will look for signs of cataracts, glaucoma, and will examine the retina and optic nerve. During this comprehensive eye exam, a refraction and visual acuity test will also be performed. These tests assess the clarity and sharpness of a person's vision and each eye is tested individually. After combining all the data collected in this eye exam, an ophthalmologist can accurately diagnose cataracts if certain conditions are met.

== Prevention ==
There is not one clear-cut way to prevent cataracts. As this specific type of cataract is associated with occupational exposures to infrared radiation, wearing protective eye equipment while on the job or taking frequent breaks can lessen the strain on the eyes. Some modifiable common risk factors unrelated to occupation are smoking, excessive alcohol consumption, deficiency in vitamin E, B1, and B2, and increased exposure of sunlight to the eyes. Risk factors that are not modifiable include previous eye injury, family history, diabetes, the use of corticosteroids, and previous eye surgery. To lessen the risk of developing cataracts it is best to limit alcohol consumption, not use or stop the use of tobacco, get adequate amounts of vitamins E, B1, and B2, and wear sunglasses and/or a wide brim hat while outside. Even if you are taking all of these steps it is still recommended that patients have eye exams every other year, or every year if over 60.

== Treatment ==
The treatment for this condition depends on how developed the cataracts are. Early on getting a new prescription and wearing sunglasses may be all a doctor suggests. If the cataracts begin to interfere with everyday life, an ophthalmologist will most likely suggest surgery. During this surgery the clouded lens will be removed and replaced with a new, artificial lens. This lens is called an intraocular lens or IOL. The surgery itself is very safe and 9 out of 10 people who undergo this surgery can see clearer post-op.
