= COSMOS cohort study =

Study of mobile phone use and health

COSMOS is a cohort study of mobile phone use and health. The study will investigate the possible health effects of long-term use of mobile phones and other wireless technologies. It is an international study being conducted in five European countries – United Kingdom, Denmark, Sweden, Finland, the Netherlands and France. In the UK, the research is being conducted by the Imperial College London.

== Survey design and data collection ==
The UK study will follow the health of approximately 90,000–100,000 volunteer mobile phone users (18+ years of age for 20–30 years). The international cohort will follow the health of approximately 250,000 European mobile phone users.

During a study pre-test in 2009 and the study main launch in 2010, prospective participants were randomly selected by their mobile phone network operator to be invited to participate. In order to maintain confidentiality the COSMOS team had no access to the personal details of those invited to participate in the study until they had given their consent.

Participants are asked to fill in an online questionnaire about their health, lifestyle and use of technology. Participants are also asked to give permission for the study to access their NHS and mobile phone records. Participants are contacted approximately once a year in order to update their details or to request additional information. The long term intention of the study is to follow participant’s health status for at least 20 years.

== Development ==
A pre-test took place in May 2009; 4,500 mobile phone users were invited to take part in the study.

The main launch of the study took place on 22 April 2010; 2.4 million UK mobile phone users were invited to participate. As of August 2010, 67,987 people were taking part in the UK arm of the study.

From February 2012 the UK study changes its eligibility criteria so that invitations were no longer mandatory to participate. Anyone aged 18 or over, who is a UK resident and uses a mobile phone can take part in the study. To take part visit the study website at www.ukcosmos.org.

Initial study results will be published in 5 years.

== Data protection ==
The Information Commissioner has advised that this research study complies fully with the requirements of the Data Protection Act 1998. All individually identifiable data will be dealt with in the strictest confidence. The results of the study will be published following independent review but no individually identifying data will ever be published. Access to data is limited to the academic research team who are required to sign strict non-disclosure agreements.

== Background ==
Mobile phones have been in widespread use for a relatively short period of time. There are currently more than six billion users of mobile phones worldwide and in the UK there are over 70 million mobile phone devices in use. It is important for current users, and for future generations, to find out whether there are any possible long-term health effects from this new and widespread technology.

Many reviews have concluded that there is no convincing evidence to date that mobile phones are harmful to health. However, the widespread use of mobile phones is a relatively recent phenomenon and it is possible that adverse health effects could emerge after years of prolonged use. Evidence to date suggests that short term (less than ten years) exposure to mobile phone emissions is not associated with an increase in brain and nervous system cancers. However, regarding longer term use, the evidence base necessary to allow firm judgments to be made has not yet been accumulated. There are still significant uncertainties that can only be resolved by monitoring the health of a large cohort of phone users over a long period of time.

A major report on mobile phones and health was published by the UK Independent Expert Group on Mobile Phones in 2000, known as the 'Stewart report ’. This report was updated by a further review of mobile phones and health undertaken by the Advisory Group on Non-Ionizing Radiation (AGNIR ) and published by the National Radiological Protection Board (NRPB) in 2005. Most recently, the independent Mobile Telecommunications and Health Research programme (MTHR), established in 2001 following the ‘Stewart Report’, published a report describing research undertaken as part of its programme.

None of the research supported by the MTHR programme and published so far demonstrates that biological or adverse health effects are produced by radiofrequency exposure from mobile phones. The report also summarizes the current evidence base regarding mobile phones and health and identifies priorities for future research.

The COSMOS study aims to carry out long term health monitoring of a large group of people to identify if there are any health issues linked to long term mobile phone use. Through this health monitoring, current uncertainties about possible long term health effects associated with this new technology can be resolved. This research has been endorsed as a priority by agencies worldwide, including the Department of Health (United Kingdom), the UK Health Protection Agency (HPA), the UK Advisory Group on Non-Ionising Radiation (AGNIR), the European Union’s Scientific Committee on Emerging and Newly Identified Health Risks (SCENHIR), and the World Health Organization (WHO).

Following the publication of the Stewart report by the Independent Expert Group on Mobile Phones in 2000, an independent research programme, called the Mobile Telecommunications and Health Research Programme (MTHR), was set up in the UK to look into the possible health impact of Mobile Telecommunications. The most recent report from the MTHR concluded that:

...short term (less than ten years) exposure to mobile phone emissions is not associated with an increase in brain and nervous system cancers. However, there are still significant uncertainties that can only be resolved by monitoring the health of a large cohort of phone users over a long period of time.

The Committee is convinced that the best way to address these uncertainties is to carry out a large cohort study of mobile phone users, an approach that has also been rated as a high priority by the World Health Organization.

== Funding ==
The UK COSMOS study, previously funded by the MTHR (an independent programme of research into mobile phones and health that was jointly supported by the Department of Health and industry), is now jointly funded by industry and government under the Research Initiative on Health and Mobile Telecommunications (RIHMT), and is managed through the Department of Health’s Policy Research Programme.

== Media interest ==
The main launch was covered in the news.

== See also ==
- BioInitiative Report
