= Prudent avoidance principle =

Risk management principle

Prudent avoidance is a precautionary principle in risk management. It states that reasonable efforts to minimise potential risks should be taken when the actual magnitude of the risks is unknown. The principle was proposed by Prof. Granger Morgan of Carnegie Mellon University in 1989 in the context of electromagnetic radiation safety (in particular, fields produced by power lines).

A report for the Office of Technology Assessment of the US Congress described prudent avoidance of power line fields as:

...looking systematically for strategies which can keep people out of 60 Hz fields arising from all sources but only adopt those which look to be "prudent" investments given their cost and our current level of scientific understanding about possible risks.

The principle has been adopted in a number of countries, for example Sweden, Denmark, Norway, Australia and New Zealand. While not adopted by any regulatory body at the national level in the USA, the principle has been adopted in some form by a number of local regulatory bodies, for example the public utility commissions in California, Colorado, Connecticut and Hawaii. The Colorado Public Commission states:

The utility shall include the concept of prudent avoidance with respect to planning, siting, construction, and operation of transmission facilities. Prudent avoidance shall mean the striking of a reasonable balance between the potential health effects of exposure to magnetic fields and the cost of impacts of mitigation of such exposure, by taking steps to reduce the exposure at reasonable or modest cost. Such steps might include, but are not limited to 1) design alternatives considering the spatial arrangement of phasing of conductors; 2) routing lines to limit exposures to areas of concentrated population and group facilities such as schools and hospitals; 3) installing higher structures; 4) widening right of way corridors; and 5) burial of lines.

The prudent avoidance principle is seen as a better alternative than other proposed approaches to risk management, such as ALARP, because it makes reasonable efforts to reduce possible risk without creating a specific numeric standard that is not supported by strong scientific evidence.
