= International Commission on Non-Ionizing Radiation Protection =

German international scientific organization

ICNIRP logo

The International Commission of Non-Ionizing Radiation Protection (ICNIRP) is an international commission specialized in non-ionizing radiation protection. The organization's activities include determining exposure limits for electromagnetic fields used by devices such as cellular phones.

ICNIRP is an independent non-profit scientific organization chartered in Germany. It was founded in 1992 by the International Radiation Protection Association (IRPA), to which it maintains close relations.

== Mission ==
The mission of ICNIRP is to screen and evaluate scientific knowledge and recent findings toward providing protection guidance on non-ionizing radiation. (i.e. radio, microwave, UV and infrared radiation). The commission produces reviews of current scientific knowledge and guidelines summarizing its evaluation. ICNIRP provides its science-based advice free of charge. In the past, national authorities in more than 50 countries and multinational authorities such as the European Union have adopted the ICNIRP guidelines and translated them into their own regulatory framework on protection of the public and of workers from established adverse health effects caused by exposure to non-ionizing radiation.

=== Commission ===
ICNIRP consists of a main commission which membership is limited to fourteen to ensure efficiency covering the fields of epidemiology, biology and medicine, physics and dosimetry and optical radiation. Its members are scientists employed typically by universities or radiation protection agencies. They do not represent their country of origin, nor their institute and can not be employed by commercial companies. Of the 14 members, there is 1 Chairperson, 1 Vice-Chairperson, and up to 12 members.

ICNIRP is widely connected to a large community working on non-ionizing radiation protection around the world. Its conferences and workshops are widely attended. ICNIRP presents its draft guidelines online for public review and comment before publication. It has ties to IRPA and is formally recognized by the World Health Organization (WHO) and the International Labour Office (ILO) as partners in the field of non-ionizing radiation. Its advice is requested by many national and multinational organizations such as the European Union (EU). Standard bodies also refer to ICNIRP health protection guidance for setting appliance standards.

=== Funding ===
To preserve its independence from vested interests ICNIRP applies fundamental principles as provided by its Charter and statutes: it does not receive financial support from commercial entities. Its funding consist solely of periodical or project grants from national and international public bodies and to a lesser extent of the income derived from its publications and scientific congresses and workshops. The members are not allowed to be employed by commercial entities. To enforce this rule, they are requested to fill in a declaration of personal interests and report any changes as they occur. Declarations of interests are publicly available on the ICNIRP website.

ICNIRP's activities are of scientific nature and deal with health risk assessment only. Policy or national or international risk management are considered outside of its scope. Balanced evidence based health risk assessment requires to screen the totality of the available science in an evaluation process. In this process the published literature is carefully read and interpreted in light of a set of quality criteria widely agreed by the scientific community.

== See also ==
- Mobile phone radiation and health
- International Radiation Protection Association - IRPA
