= Non-ionizing radiation =

Less harmful range of electromagnetic energy

Different types of electromagnetic radiation

Non-ionizing (or non-ionising) radiation refers to any type of electromagnetic radiation that does not carry enough energy per quantum (photon energy) to ionize atoms or molecules—that is, to completely remove an electron from an atom or molecule. Instead of producing charged ions when passing through matter, non-ionizing electromagnetic radiation has sufficient energy only for excitation (the movement of an electron to a higher energy state). Non-ionizing radiation is not a significant health risk except in circumstances of prolonged exposure to higher frequency non-ionizing radiation or high power densities as may occur in laboratories and industrial workplaces. Non-ionizing radiation is used in various technologies, including radio broadcasting, telecommunications, medical imaging, and heat therapy.

In contrast, ionizing radiation has a higher frequency and shorter wavelength than non-ionizing radiation, and can be a serious health hazard: exposure to it can cause burns, radiation sickness, many kinds of cancer, and genetic damage. Using ionizing radiation requires elaborate radiological protection measures, which in general are not required with non-ionizing radiation.

The region at which radiation is considered "ionizing" is not well defined, since different molecules and atoms ionize at different energies. The usual definitions have suggested that radiation with particle or photon energies less than 10 electronvolts (eV) be considered non-ionizing. Another suggested threshold is 33 electronvolts, which is the energy needed to ionize water molecules. The light from the Sun that reaches the Earth is largely composed of non-ionizing radiation, since the ionizing far-ultraviolet rays have been filtered out by the gases in the atmosphere, particularly oxygen.

== Mechanisms of interaction with matter, including living tissue ==
Near ultraviolet, visible light, infrared, microwave, radio waves, and low-frequency radio frequency (very low frequency, extremely low frequency) are all examples of non-ionizing radiation. By contrast, far ultraviolet light, X-rays, gamma-rays, and all particle radiation from radioactive decay are ionizing. Visible and near ultraviolet electromagnetic radiation may induce photochemical reactions, or accelerate radical reactions, such as photochemical aging of varnishes or the breakdown of flavoring compounds in beer to produce the "lightstruck flavor". Near ultraviolet radiation, although technically non-ionizing, may still excite and cause photochemical reactions in some molecules. This happens because at ultraviolet photon energies, molecules may become electronically excited or promoted to free-radical form, even without ionization taking place.

The occurrence of ionization depends on the energy of the individual particles or waves, and not on their number. An intense flood of particles or waves will not cause ionization if these particles or waves do not carry enough energy to be ionizing, unless they raise the temperature of a body to a point high enough to ionize small fractions of atoms or molecules by the process of thermal-ionization. In such cases, even "non-ionizing radiation" is capable of causing thermal-ionization if it deposits enough heat to raise temperatures to ionization energies. These reactions occur at far higher energies than with ionizing radiation, which requires only a single particle to ionize. A familiar example of thermal ionization is the flame-ionization of a common fire, and the browning reactions in common food items induced by infrared radiation, during broiling-type cooking.

The energy of non-ionizing radiation is low, and instead of producing charged ions when passing through matter, it has only sufficient energy to change the rotational, vibrational or electronic valence configurations of molecules and atoms. This produces thermal effects. The possible non-thermal effects of non-ionizing forms of radiation on living tissue have only recently been studied. Much of the current debate is about relatively low levels of exposure to radio frequency (RF) radiation from mobile phones and base stations producing "non-thermal" effects. Some experiments have suggested that there may be biological effects at non-thermal exposure levels, but the evidence for production of health hazard is contradictory and unproven. The scientific community and international bodies acknowledge that further research is needed to improve our understanding in some areas. The consensus is that there is no consistent and convincing scientific evidence of adverse health effects caused by RF radiation at powers sufficiently low that no thermal health effects are produced.

== Health risks ==
Different biological effects are observed for different types of non-ionizing radiation. The upper frequencies (lower energy ultraviolet) of non-ionizing radiation are capable of non-thermal biological damage, similar to ionizing radiation. It is still to be proven that non-thermal effects of radiation of much lower frequencies (microwave, millimetre and radiowave radiation) entail health risks.

=== Upper frequencies ===
Prolonged exposure to non-ionizing ultraviolet light is a risk factor for developing skin cancer (especially non-melanoma skin cancers), sunburn, and premature aging of skin. Damage to the eye includes photokeratitis. There is some evidence that exposure also increase the risk of infection.

=== Lower frequencies ===
Non-ionizing radiation hazard sign

Lower frequency non-ionizing radiation can produce non-mutagenic effects through additional thermal energy in biological tissue that can lead to burns. Power densities above 100mW/cm^{2} can increase body temperature and may cause tissue damage, especially to eyes and testes. These intensities are a concern for industrial workplace safety.

In 2011, the International Agency for Research on Cancer (IARC) from the World Health Organization (WHO) released a statement adding RF electromagnetic fields (including microwave and millimetre waves) to their list of things which are possibly carcinogenic to humans.

In terms of potential biological effects, the non-ionizing portion of the spectrum can be subdivided into:

1. The optical radiation portion, where electron excitation can occur (visible light, infrared light)
2. The portion where the wavelength is smaller than the body. Heating via induced currents can occur. In addition, there are claims of other adverse biological effects. Such effects are not well understood and even largely denied. (Microwave and higher-frequency RF).
3. The portion where the wavelength is much larger than the body, and heating via induced currents seldom occurs (lower-frequency RF, power frequencies, static fields).

The above effects have only been shown to be due to heating effects. At low power levels where there is no heating effect, the risk of cancer is not significant.

The International Agency for Research on Cancer recently stated that there could be some risk from non-ionizing radiation to humans. But a subsequent study reported that the basis of the IARC evaluation was not consistent with observed incidence trends. This and other reports suggest that there is virtually no way that results on which the IARC based its conclusions are correct.

== Types ==
	Source	Wavelength	Frequency	Biological effects
UV-C	Black light, Sunlight	100-280 nm		Eye: photochemical cataract; skin: erythema, including pigmentation
UV-B	Black light, Sunlight	280–315 nm		Eye: photochemical cataract; skin: erythema, including pigmentation
UV-A	Black light, Sunlight	315–400 nm		Eye: photochemical cataract; skin: erythema, including pigmentation
Visible light	Sunlight, fire, LEDs, light bulbs, lasers	400–780 nm	385–750 THz	Eye: photochemical & thermal retinal injury; skin: photoaging
IR-A	Sunlight, thermal radiation, incandescent light bulbs, lasers, remote controls	780 nm – 1.4 μm	215–385 THz	Eye: thermal retinal injury, thermal cataract; skin: burn
IR-B	Sunlight, thermal radiation, incandescent light bulbs, lasers	1.4–3 μm	100–215 THz	Eye: corneal burn, cataract; skin: burn
IR-C	Sunlight, thermal radiation, incandescent light bulbs, far-infrared laser	3 μm – 1 mm	300 GHz – 100 THz	Eye: corneal burn, cataract; heating of body surface
Microwave	Mobile/cell phones, microwave ovens, cordless phones, millimeter waves, airport millimeter scanners, motion detectors, long-distance telecommunications, radar, Wi-Fi	1 mm – 33 cm	1–300 GHz	Heating of body tissue
Radio-frequency radiation	Mobile/cell phones, television, FM, AM, shortwave, CB, cordless phones	33 cm – 3 km	100 kHz – 1 GHz	Heating of body tissue, raised body temperature
Low-frequency RF	Power lines	>3 km	<100 kHz	Cumulation of charge on body surface; disturbance of nerve & muscle responses
Static field	Strong magnets, MRI	Infinite	0 Hz (technically static fields are not "radiation")	Electric charge on body surface

=== Near ultraviolet radiation ===
Ultraviolet light can cause burns to skin and cataracts to the eyes. Ultraviolet is classified into near, medium and far UV according to energy, where near and medium ultraviolet are technically non-ionizing, but where all UV wavelengths can cause photochemical reactions that to some extent mimic ionization (including DNA damage and carcinogenesis). UV radiation above 10 eV (wavelength shorter than 125 nm) is considered ionizing. However, the rest of the UV spectrum from 3.1 eV (400 nm) to 10 eV, although technically non-ionizing, can produce photochemical reactions that are damaging to molecules by means other than simple heat. Since these reactions are often very similar to those caused by ionizing radiation, often the entire UV spectrum is considered to be equivalent to ionization radiation in its interaction with many systems (including biological systems).

For example, ultraviolet light, even in the non-ionizing range, can produce free radicals that induce cellular damage, and can be carcinogenic. Photochemistry such as pyrimidine dimer formation in DNA can happen through most of the UV band, including much of the band that is formally non-ionizing. Ultraviolet light induces melanin production from melanocyte cells to cause sun tanning of skin. Vitamin D is produced on the skin by a radical reaction initiated by UV radiation.

Plastic (polycarbonate) sunglasses generally absorb UV radiation. UV overexposure to the eyes causes snow blindness, common to areas with reflective surfaces, such as snow or water.

=== Visible light ===
Light, or visible light, is the very narrow range of electromagnetic radiation that is visible to the human eye (about 400–700 nm), or up to 380–750 nm. More broadly, physicists refer to light as electromagnetic radiation of all wavelengths, whether visible or not.

High-energy visible light is blue-violet light with a higher damaging potential.

=== Infrared ===
Infrared (IR) light is electromagnetic radiation with a wavelength between 0.7 and 300 micrometers, which equates to a frequency range between approximately 1 and 430 THz. IR wavelengths are longer than that of visible light, but shorter than that of terahertz radiation microwaves. Bright sunlight provides an irradiance of just over 1 kilowatt per square meter at sea level. Of this energy, 527 watts is infrared radiation, 445 watts is visible light, and 32 watts is ultraviolet radiation.

=== Microwave ===
Microwaves are electromagnetic waves with wavelengths ranging from as long as one meter to as short as one millimeter, or equivalently, with frequencies between 300 MHz (0.3 GHz) and 300 GHz. This broad definition includes both UHF and EHF (millimeter waves), and various sources use different boundaries. In all cases, microwave includes the entire SHF band (3 to 30 GHz, or 10 to 1 cm) at minimum, with RF engineering often putting the lower boundary at 1 GHz (30 cm), and the upper around 100 GHz (3mm). Applications include cellphone (mobile) telephones, radars, airport scanners, microwave ovens, earth remote sensing satellites, and radio and satellite communications.

=== Radio waves ===
Radio waves are a type of electromagnetic radiation with wavelengths in the electromagnetic spectrum longer than infrared light. Like all other electromagnetic waves, they travel at the speed of light. Naturally occurring radio waves are made by lightning, or by astronomical objects. Artificially generated radio waves are used for fixed and mobile radio communication, broadcasting, radar and other navigation systems, satellite communication, computer networks and innumerable other applications. Different frequencies of radio waves have different propagation characteristics in the Earth's atmosphere; long waves may cover a part of the Earth very consistently, shorter waves can reflect off the ionosphere and travel around the world, and much shorter wavelengths bend or reflect very little and travel on a line of sight.

=== Very low frequency (VLF) ===
Very low frequency or VLF is the range of RF of 3 to 30 kHz. Since there is not much bandwidth in this band of the radio spectrum, only the very simplest signals are used, such as for radio navigation. Also known as the myriametre band or myriametre wave as the wavelengths range from ten to one myriametre (an obsolete metric unit equal to 10 kilometres).

=== Extremely low frequency (ELF) ===
Extremely low frequency (ELF) is the range of radiation frequencies from 300 Hz to 3 kHz. In atmosphere science, an alternative definition is usually given, from 3 Hz to 3 kHz. In the related magnetosphere science, the lower frequency electromagnetic oscillations (pulsations occurring below ~3 Hz) are considered to be in the ULF range, which is thus also defined differently from the ITU Radio Bands.

=== Thermal radiation ===
Thermal radiation, a common synonym for infrared when it occurs at temperatures commonly encountered on Earth, is the process by which the surface of an object radiates its thermal energy in the form of electromagnetic waves. Infrared radiation that one can feel emanating from a household heater, infra-red heat lamp, or kitchen oven are examples of thermal radiation, as is the IR and visible light emitted by a glowing incandescent light bulb (not hot enough to emit the blue high frequencies and therefore appearing yellowish; fluorescent lamps are not thermal and can appear bluer). Thermal radiation is generated when the energy from the movement of charged particles within molecules is converted to the radiant energy of electromagnetic waves. The emitted wave frequency of the thermal radiation is a probability distribution depending only on temperature, and for a black body is given by Planck's law of radiation. Wien's displacement law gives the most likely frequency of the emitted radiation, and the Stefan–Boltzmann law gives the heat intensity (power emitted per area).

Parts of the electromagnetic spectrum of thermal radiation may be ionizing, if the object emitting the radiation is hot enough (has a high enough temperature). A common example of such radiation is sunlight, which is thermal radiation from the Sun's photosphere and which contains enough ultraviolet light to cause ionization in many molecules and atoms. An extreme example is the flash from the detonation of a nuclear weapon, which emits a large number of ionizing X-rays purely as a product of heating the atmosphere around the bomb to extremely high temperatures.

As noted above, even low-frequency thermal radiation may cause temperature-ionization whenever it deposits sufficient thermal energy to raises temperatures to a high enough level. Common examples of this are the ionization (plasma) seen in common flames, and the molecular changes caused by the "browning" in food-cooking, which is a chemical process that begins with a large component of ionization.

=== Black-body radiation ===
Black-body radiation is radiation from an idealized radiator that emits at any temperature the maximum possible amount of radiation at any given wavelength. A black body will also absorb the maximum possible incident radiation at any given wavelength. The radiation emitted covers the entire electromagnetic spectrum and the intensity (power/unit-area) at a given frequency is dictated by Planck's law of radiation. A black body at temperatures at or below room temperature would thus appear absolutely black as it would not reflect any light. Theoretically a black body emits electromagnetic radiation over the entire spectrum from very low frequency radio waves to X-rays. The frequency at which the black-body radiation is at maximum is given by Wien's displacement law.

== See also ==
- Electromagnetic hypersensitivity
- Electromagnetic radiation and health
- Electronic harassment
- Ionizing radiation
- Mobile phone radiation and health
- Wireless electronic devices and health
