= RCE =

RCE may refer to:

== Arts, entertainment and media ==
- Red Chillies Entertainment, an Indian motion picture production and distribution company
- River City Extension, an American indie rock band
- RCE - Remote Code Execution, 2022 science fiction novel by Sibylle Berg

== Business and organizations ==
- Radiation, Chemical and Environmental Hazards Directorate (RCE, formerly CRCE), part of the UK Health Security Agency (UKHSA)
- Regional Centres of Expertise, to promote education for sustainable development
- Rijksdienst voor het Cultureel Erfgoed, a Dutch state heritage organisation
- Royal Canadian Engineers, a former administrative corps of the Canadian army

== Economics and law ==
- Recursive competitive equilibrium, an economic concept
- Request for continued examination, a possible step in a patent application process
- Randomized controlled experiment (or randomized controlled trial), a type of scientific experiment or intervention study

== Biology and medicine ==
- Ras converting enzyme, (see RCE1)
- Recurrent corneal erosion

== Computing and electronics ==
- Region-code enhanced, a type of DVD region code
- Remote code execution, a computer security vulnerability
- Remote component environment, a distributed, workflow-driven integration environment
- Reverse code engineering, reverse engineering of binary software

== Other uses ==
- Registered Civil Engineer
- Redcar East railway station, England (National Rail station code RCE)
- Flemington Racecourse railway station, Melbourne
- Residential Customer Equivalent, a unit of measure for energy consumption
