= National Radiological Protection Board =

The National Radiological Protection Board (NRPB) was a public authority in the UK created by the Radiological Protection Act 1970. Its statutory functions were to conduct research on radiological protection and provide advice and information on the subject to Government Departments and others. It was also authorized to provide technical services and charge for them. Originally NRPB dealt only with ionizing radiation, but its functions were extended in 1974 to non-ionizing radiation.

== Structure ==
The Board consisted of a chairman and a maximum of nine other members, later increased to twelve, all appointed by Health Ministers. Throughout its existence, NRPB had 300 members of staff on average. They were located at the headquarters in Chilton near Oxford and at laboratories in Leeds and Glasgow. The Department of Health funded the difference between the cost of NRPB and its income by annual grant.

== Work ==
Research on ionizing radiation included: plutonium exposure; internal dosimetry; radioactive discharges; nuclear accidents and wastes; radon hazards; medical x rays; epidemiology and molecular biology. Research on non-ionizing radiation included the physics and biology of exposure to ultraviolet sources, electricity supplies, and mobile phones.

As well as a full range of technical services - from personnel dosimetry to radiation surveys - NRPB also engaged in projects such as: the safe transport of radioactive materials; preparedness for nuclear emergencies; exposure to cosmic rays; optimization of protection; improved radiation instruments; training courses; a wide selection of publications.

Members of staff contributed to major public inquiries about the nuclear industry in the UK and supported the UK response to the Chernobyl disaster. They also participated in the work of the International Commission on Radiological Protection; the International Commission on Non-Ionizing Radiation Protection; the United Nations Scientific Committee on the Effects of Atomic Radiation; the Nuclear Energy Agency; and various committees of the Commission of the European Communities.

== Transition ==
The Health Protection Agency Act 2004 repealed the Radiological Protection Act. On 1 April 2005, NRPB became the Radiation Protection Division of the Health Protection Agency (HPA). Under the terms of the Health and Social Care Act 2012, the HPA was abolished, and responsibility for radiation protection functions was assigned to the Public Health England Centre for Radiation, Chemical and Environmental Hazards (CRCE) at the Harwell Science and Innovation Campus near Chilton, Oxfordshire.
