= Angelina Guskova =

Russian neurologist

- Born: Angelina Konstantinovna Guskova; March 29, 1924; Krasnoyarsk, RSFSR, USSR
- Died: April 7, 2015; Moscow, Russia
- Awards: Medal "For Labour Valour" (1957); Lenin Prize (1963); Order of Friendship of Peoples (1971); Gold Medal for Radiation Protection (2000)

Angelina Konstantinovna Guskova (Russian: Ангели́на Константи́новна Гусько́ва, IPA: [ɐnɡʲɪˈlʲinə kənstɐnʲˈtʲinəvnə ɡʊsʲˈkovə]; 29 March 1924 — 7 April 2015) was a Russian neurologist, neurosurgeon and radiation protection expert. She was associated with the Soviet atomic bomb project from 1949 and thereafter established radiation protection standards and medical management guidelines after nuclear accidents, also serving on the United Nations Scientific Committee on the Effects of Atomic Radiation (UNSCEAR).

== Life and career ==
She was born in Krasnoyarsk to pianist Zoya Vasilyevna Guskov and doctor Konstantin Vasilyevich. On her father's side, there were three generations of medical service. From 1926, the family moved to Nizhny Tagil, Sverdlovsk Oblast. Guskova herself became the fourth generation in medicine, graduating in 1946. Initially she worked in the area of nervous disorders and neurosurgery.

From 1948, medical staff were called to replenish personnel in the Medical Sanitary Department at Chelyabinsk-40, a closed city which was part of the nascent Soviet nuclear programme. Between March and May that year, standards for exposure to and control of radionuclides began to be established by the Academy of Medical Sciences (later the Institute of Biophysics (IBP)), with a maximum dose per worker of 1 millisievert per day (compared to 2.4 millisieverts average dose per person received from background radiation in one year worldwide) and initial guidelines were approved in August. In 1949, Guskova was given one month to move to Moscow to work under A.I. Burnazyan. She worked to serve the personnel of Plutonium Combine No. 817, workers of construction and installation organizations, and residents of Chelyabinsk-40. The Mayak factory near Ozyorsk, Chelyabinsk Oblast, which had been built to produce plutonium, had already produced enough for the first Soviet nuclear device, Until 1953, Guskova led the neurological department at IES No. 71 in Ozyorsk, her main foci being neuropathology and neurosurgery.

The first patients with chronic radiation sickness were identified at Combine No. 817 in 1949, with the acute form in August 1950. Guskova gained her Ph.D. in 1951. In April 1953, she and G.D. Baysogolov reported to the minister Vyacheslav Malyshev, minister of health Burnazyan and Soviet atomic project supervisor Igor Kurchatov, presenting an argument in favour of a research, treatment and advisory centre: the Institute of Biophysics began in May that year with Baysogolov as chief and Guskova as senior researcher. Its main activities became the diagnosis and treatment of radiation sickness. Guskova and Baysogolov developed the system of classification of radiation sickness. The 2nd therapeutic department was where the most qualified doctors worked to serve the industry's employees: all the data collected was primary research data in the field and rules and scientific procedures were developed in kind to protect the employees and the doctors, resulting in the recovery of nearly 90% of patients affected by radiation sickness. Guskova lectured internationally on the effects of radiation sickness and provided a further thesis on the neurological effects of radiation sickness in 1956. In 1957, she won the first of her state awards, the Medal "For Labour Valour". Between 1953 and 1958, she developed new rules on exposure to ionizing radiation sources and subsequent medical examinations.

In 1961, she became the chief of the radiology department of the Institute of Occupational Hygiene and Occupational Diseases of the USSR Academy of Medical Sciences. She initiated control studies in various regions of the country, forming a large control group for ten years' observation with active assessment of parameters such as haemodynamics, haematopoiesis, and hormone function. She returned to the IBP in 1974 as head of the clinical department. From 1998, she was chief scientific officer and chief researcher of the IBP (now the A.I. Burnazyan Federal Medical Biophysical Centre).

In 1986, she was elected a corresponding member of the Russian Academy of Medical Sciences. The Chernobyl disaster occurred that year, and Guskova guided the medical treatment of 134 patients with acute radiation sickness. She wrote a report for UNSCEAR a few months later. From 1989 to 1993, she was a member of the Main Commission on Radiological Protection. She was also an honorary professor of the Urals Research Centre for Radiation Medicine. In her career, she trained many postgraduate and doctoral students. She authored approximately two hundred professional publications, including guidelines on the management of treatment of patients after nuclear accidents. She was deputy chair of the state scientific council on biophysics from 1959, a member of the national commission for radiation protection, from 1967 a member of UNSCEAR, and a member of the Russian Interagency Expert Council on the establishment of causal effects of ailments pertaining to atomic radiation.

She died in Moscow in 2015 aged 91 after a long illness.

== Awards ==
- 1957: Medal "For Labour Valour"
- 1963: Lenin Prize.
- 1971: Order of Friendship of Peoples
- 2000: Gold Medal in Radiation Protection from the Royal Swedish Academy of Sciences & Honoured Scientist of the Russian Soviet Federative Socialist Republic
