= Diefenthal =

Diefenthal is a German surname. Notable people with the surname include:

- Frédéric Diefenthal (born 1968), French actor and director
- Helmut Diefenthal (1924–2019), German-born American radiologist
- Josef Diefenthal (1915–2001), German war criminal
