= Irpa =

Irpa may refer to:

- Þorgerðr Hölgabrúðr and Irpa - Irpa, a goddess in Norse mythology
- Immigration and Refugee Protection Act
- International Radiation Protection Association
- International Rugby Players' Association
