= Society for Radiological Protection =

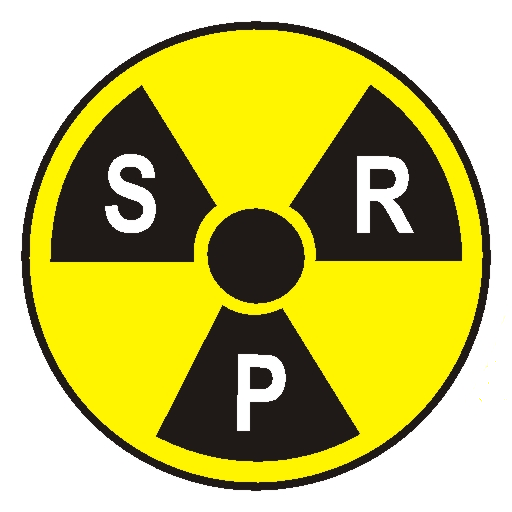
- Abbreviation: SRP
- Formation: 1963
- President: Prof. Mike Wood
- Affiliations: International Radiation Protection Association
- Website: http://www.srp-uk.org/

The Society for Radiological Protection is the leading UK professional body promoting learning and skills in the field of Radiological Protection. The Society was formed in 1963, and received its Royal Charter in 2007. It has the overall objectives of improving public knowledge and maintaining professional standards in that field. It is the largest society of its kind in Europe, and second largest in the world.

In 1998 the SRP was affiliated to IRPA, the International Radiation Protection Association, as the UK Associate Society. It is a registered UK charity.

The society is a joint publisher of the Journal of Radiological Protection.

== History ==
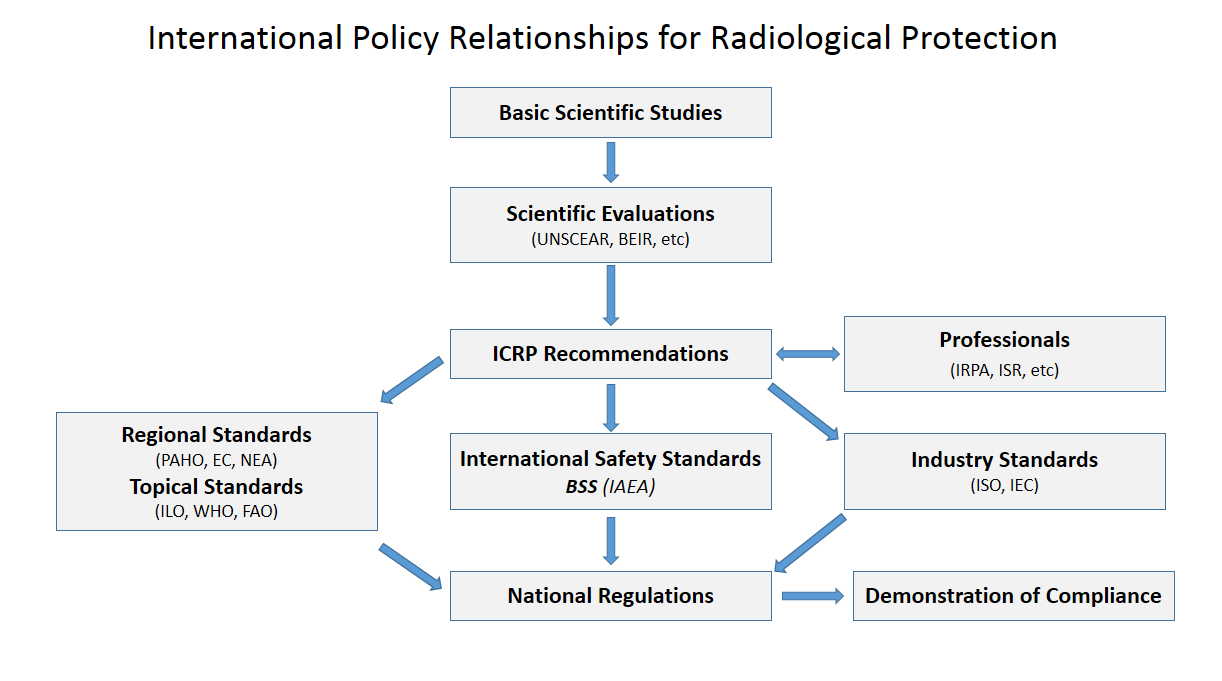
International policy relationships in radiological protection

Originally the UK branch of the US Health Physics Society, The Society for Radiological Protection was founded in 1963. The society was renamed as The Society for Radiological Protection when the formal connection with the Health Physics Society was dissolved two years later. The later part of the decade saw the adoption of a constitution and the first awards of Honorary Fellowships. The society started issuing the Certificate of Professional Competence in Operational Health Physics in 1979. This was later transferred to a separate legal entity: RPA2000.

The Journal of Radiological Protection was started in 1981, and is currently published by Institute of Physics Publishing. In 1996, the society developed the first NVQ standards in radiation protection, which were accredited in April 1997.

In 2000, the society set up RPA2000 with The Institute of Physics and Engineering in Medicine; the Institute of Radiation Protection and the Association of University Radiation Protection Officers. RPA2000 is the sole certifier of competence in radiation protection practice. The Society for Radiological Protection is the major stakeholder in RPA2000.

The society received its royal charter in 2007, and in 2008 registered as charity number 1122804.

== Chartered Status ==
The Society of Radiological Protection was granted a Royal Charter in 2007. This formally recognised radiation protection as a profession and allowed the creation of the title Chartered Radiation Protection Professional, with suitably qualified members being entitled to use the post-nominal letters CRadP.

== Rising Generations Group ==
Set up in early 2010 to promote less experienced radiation protection professionals in the Society, and to focus on the needs of newer members. The aim of the group is to help members develop their careers in the field of radiation protection. It is open to any member of the society who would be interested in establishing or progressing their career.

== Partner Societies ==
The Society for Radiological Protection is partnered with:

- Association of University Radiation Protection Officers (AURPO)
- British Institute of Radiology (BIR)
- British Nuclear Medicine Society (BNMS)
- Institute of Physics & Engineering in Medicine (IPEM)
- Royal College of Radiologists (RCR)
- Society & College of Radiographers (SOR)

== Presidents ==
Current President: Mike Wood 2025-27

Past Presidents have been:

- 2023/25: Jennifer Humphries
- 2021/23: Jim Thurston
- 2019/21: Pete Bryant
- 2017/19: Amber Bannon
- 2015/17: Peter Cole (dec)
- 2013/15: Peter Marsden
- 2012/13: John Broughton
- 2011/12: Christopher Englefield
- 2010/11: Richard Wilkins
- 2009/10: Rick Hallard
- 2008/9: George Sallit
- 2007/8: Sheila Liddle
- 2006/7: Cathy Griffiths OBE
- 2005/6: Wendy Bines OBE
- 2004/5: Colin Partington MBE
- 2003/4: John Croft
- 2002/3: Mike Marshall
- 2001/2: Mike Thorne
- 2000/1: John Marshall
- 1999/2000: Frances Fry (dec)
- 1998/9: John Hunt
- 1997/8: Margaret Minski
- 1996/7: Monty Charles
- 1995/6: Roger Coates OBE
- 1994/5: Bernard Wilcox
- 1993/4: Geoff Roberts
- 1992/3: Eddie Goldfinch
- 1991/2: Geoff Webb
- 1990/1: Peter Beaver
- 1989/90: Tony Gibson
- 1988/9: Ian Thompson
- 1987/8: John Jackson
- 1986/7: Ken Shaw
- 1985/6: Bill Saxby OBE (dec)
- 1984/5: Muir Wasson
- 1983/4: F Morley (dec)
- 1982/3: A Preston (dec)
- 1981/2: Roger Clarke CBE
- 1980/1: Hugh Orchard
- 1979/80: Bernard James
- 1978/9: Bernard Wheatley
- 1977/8: Pam Bryant
- 1976/7: John Lakey
- 1975/6: Hugh Evans (dec)
- 1974/5: Jack Martin (dec)
- 1972/4: J A Bonnell (dec)
- 1971/2: Jack Vennart (dec)
- 1970/1: G C Dale (dec)
- 1969/70: P Hughes OBE (dec)
- 1968/9: B Lister (dec)
- 1967/8: C A Adams (dec)
- 1966/7: John Dunster CB (dec)
- 1965/6: Sydney Osborn
- 1963/5: Greg Marley OBE (dec)

== Honorary Fellows ==
2025: Keith Lawrey, Shelley Mobbs, Pete Cole (posthumously)

2024: George Hunter, Alex Rankine

2023: Amber Bannon, Claire-Louise Chappell

2022: John Boice, Roger Collinson, Susan McCready-Shea

2021: Steve Griffiths

2020: John Bradshaw

2019: Peter Marsden, Richard Paynter, Alan Marsh.

2018: Phil Tattersall, Jan Pentreath, Claire Cousins.

2017: Brian Gornall, John Broughton, Arwel Barratt.

2016: Pete Burgess, Ian Robinson.

2015: Colin Martin, Mike Renouf.

2014: John Marshall, Chris Perks, John Harrison.

2013: Penny Allisy-Roberts, John Croft, Clive Williams.

2012: Sheila Liddle, Richard Wakeford, Mike Thorne.

2011: Wendy Bines, Tony R Richards, Eddie Goldfinch, Bernard James.

2010: Jack Valentin, Cathy Griffiths, Bernard Willcox

2009: Lorna Arnold OBE, Tony Hudson, Colin Partington

2008: Roger Coates, John Scott, John Hunt.

2007: Julian Preston, Roger Cox.

2006: Pauline Powell

2005: Ken Shaw, Geoff Roberts, Eric Hall.

2004: John Gill

2003: John Jackson, Jack Schull, Dudley Goodhead.

2002: Margaret Minski, John Stather.

2001: Peter Beaver, Muir Wasson.

2000: Bryn Bridges

1999: Keith Boddy, Alan Knight, Geoff Webb.

1995: Roger Clarke CBE

1994: Sir Richard Doll

1993: John Bonnell, David Sowby

1992: John Lakey

1991: Bill Saxby

1990: Hugh Orchard

1989: Jack Martin, Bernard Wheatley

1988: John Dunster CB, Bryan Lister.

1986: Robin Mole

1984: Jack Vennart

1973: Greg Marley, Charles Adams.

1970: Val Mayneord CBE, Walter Binks, Sir Edward Pochin

== See also ==
- Centre for Radiation, Chemical and Environmental Hazards (CRCE) in Oxfordshire
- Sievert
- Dosimetry
