= International Commission on Radiological Protection =

Organization on radiation effects

- Abbreviation: ICRP
- Formation: 1928
- Type: INGO
- Location: Ottawa, Ontario, Canada
- Region served: Worldwide
- Official language: English
- Website: ICRP Official website

The International Commission on Radiological Protection (ICRP) is an independent, international, non-governmental organization, with the mission to protect people, animals, and the environment from the harmful effects of ionising radiation. Its recommendations form the basis of radiological protection policy, regulations, guidelines and practice worldwide.

The ICRP was effectively founded in 1928 at the second International Congress of Radiology in Stockholm, Sweden, but was then called the International X-ray and Radium Protection Committee (IXRPC). In 1950 it was restructured to take account of new uses of radiation outside the medical area and re-named as the ICRP.

The ICRP is a sister organisation to the International Commission on Radiation Units and Measurements (ICRU). In general terms ICRU defines the units, and ICRP recommends, develops and maintains the international system of radiological protection which uses these units.

== Operation ==
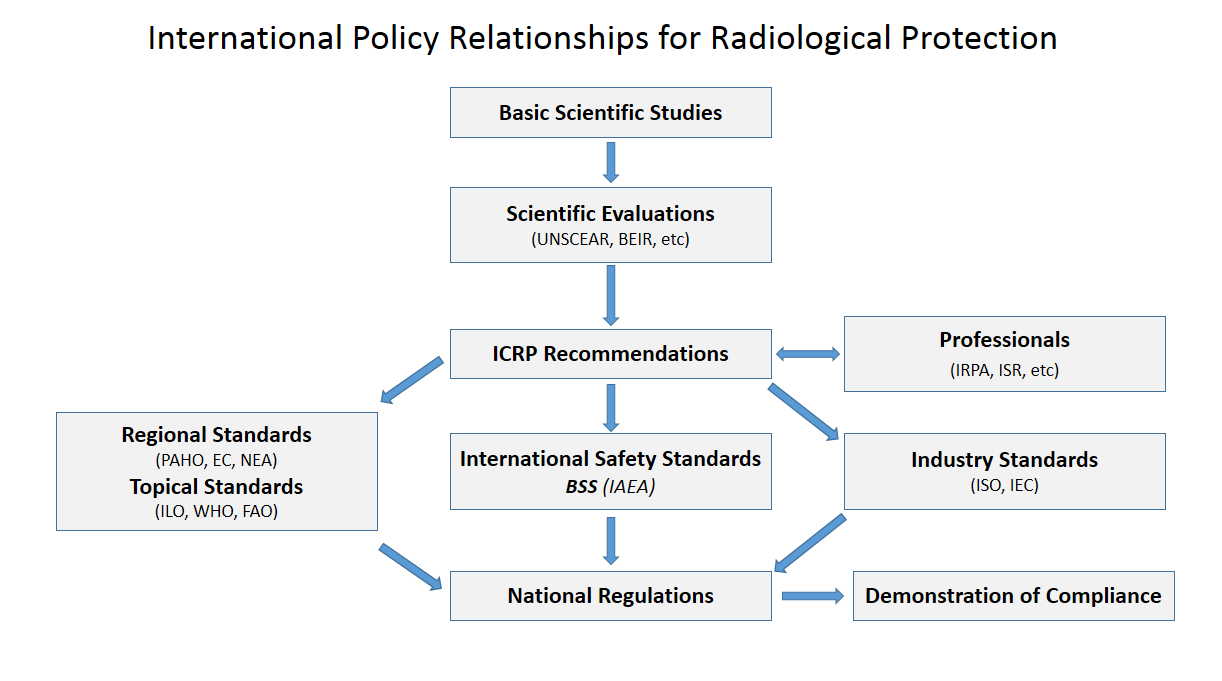
International policy relationships in radiological protection. The ICRP sits at the interface between ongoing worldwide radiation research and the creation of internationally agreed recommendations for regulation and practice

The ICRP is a not-for-profit organization registered as a charity in the United Kingdom and has its scientific secretariat in Ottawa, Ontario, Canada.

It is an independent, international organization with more than two hundred volunteer members from approximately thirty countries on six continents, who represent the world's leading scientists and policy makers in the field of radiological protection.

The International System of Radiological Protection has been developed by ICRP based on the current understanding of the science of radiation exposures and effects, and value judgements. These value judgements take into account societal expectations, ethics, and experience gained in application of the system.

The work of the Commission centres on the operation of four main committees:

Committee 1 Radiation Effects
Committee 1 considers the effects of radiation action from the subcellular to population and ecosystem levels, including the induction of cancer, heritable and other diseases, impairment of tissue/organ function and developmental defects, and assesses implications for protection of people and the environment.

Committee 2 Doses from Radiation Exposure
Committee 2 develops dosimetric methodology for the assessment of internal and external radiation exposures, including reference biokinetic and dosimetric models and reference data and dose coefficients, for use in the protection of people and the environment.

Committee 3 Radiological Protection in Medicine
Committee 3 addresses protection of persons and unborn children when ionising radiation is used in medical diagnosis, therapy, and biomedical research, as well as protection in veterinary medicine.

Committee 4 Application of the Commission's Recommendations
Committee 4 provides advice on the application of the Commission's recommendations for the protection of people and the environment in an integrated manner for all exposure situations.

Supporting these committees are Task Groups, established primarily to develop ICRP publications.

The ICRP's key output is the production of regular publications disseminating information and recommendations through the "Annals of the ICRP".

== International Symposia ==
These have become one of the main means of communicating advances by the ICRP in the form of technical presentations and reports from various committees drawn from the international radiological protection community. They have been held every two years since 2011.

- 1st International ICRP symposium 2011. Key areas of focus: Various.
- 2nd International ICRP symposium 2013. Key areas of focus: science, NORM, emergency preparedness and recovery, medicine, environment.
- 3rd International ICRP symposium 2015. Key areas of focus: Medicine, science and ethics
- 4th International ICRP symposium 2017. Key areas of focus: Recovery after nuclear accidents
- 5th International symposium 2019. Key areas of focus: Mines, Medicine and Space travel.

== History ==
=== Early dangers ===
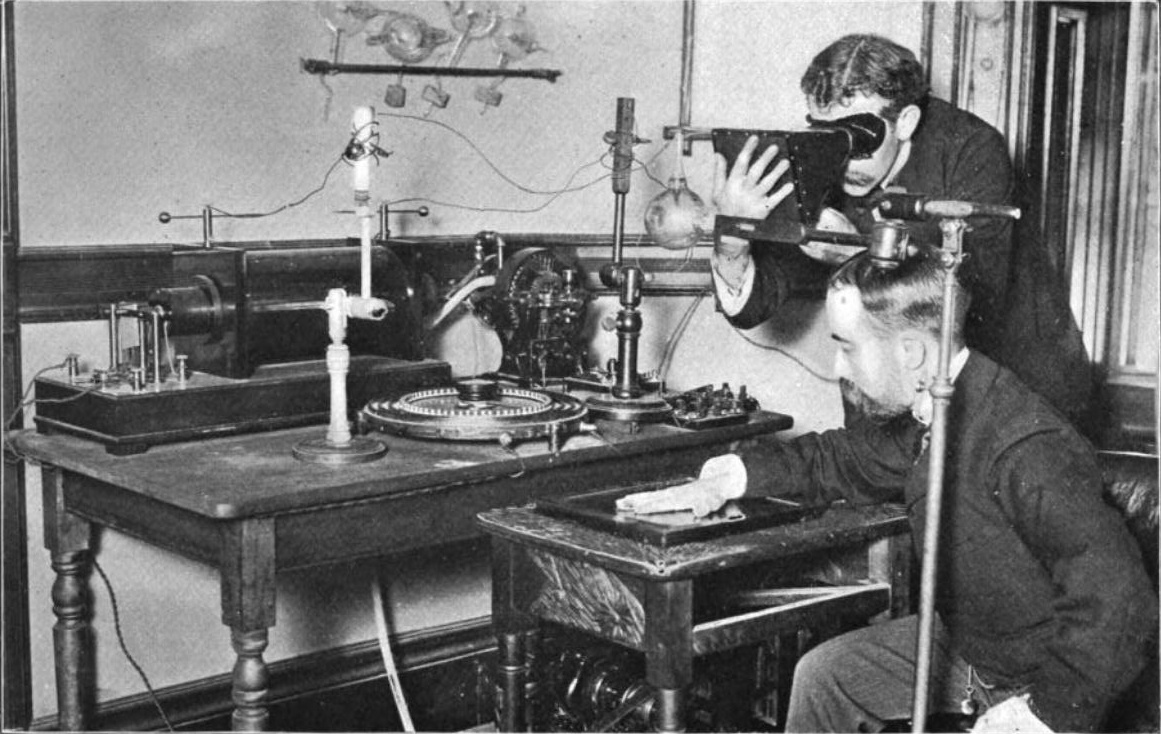
Using early Crookes tube X-Ray apparatus in 1896. One man is viewing his hand with a fluoroscope to optimise tube emissions, the other has his head close to the tube. No precautions are being taken.

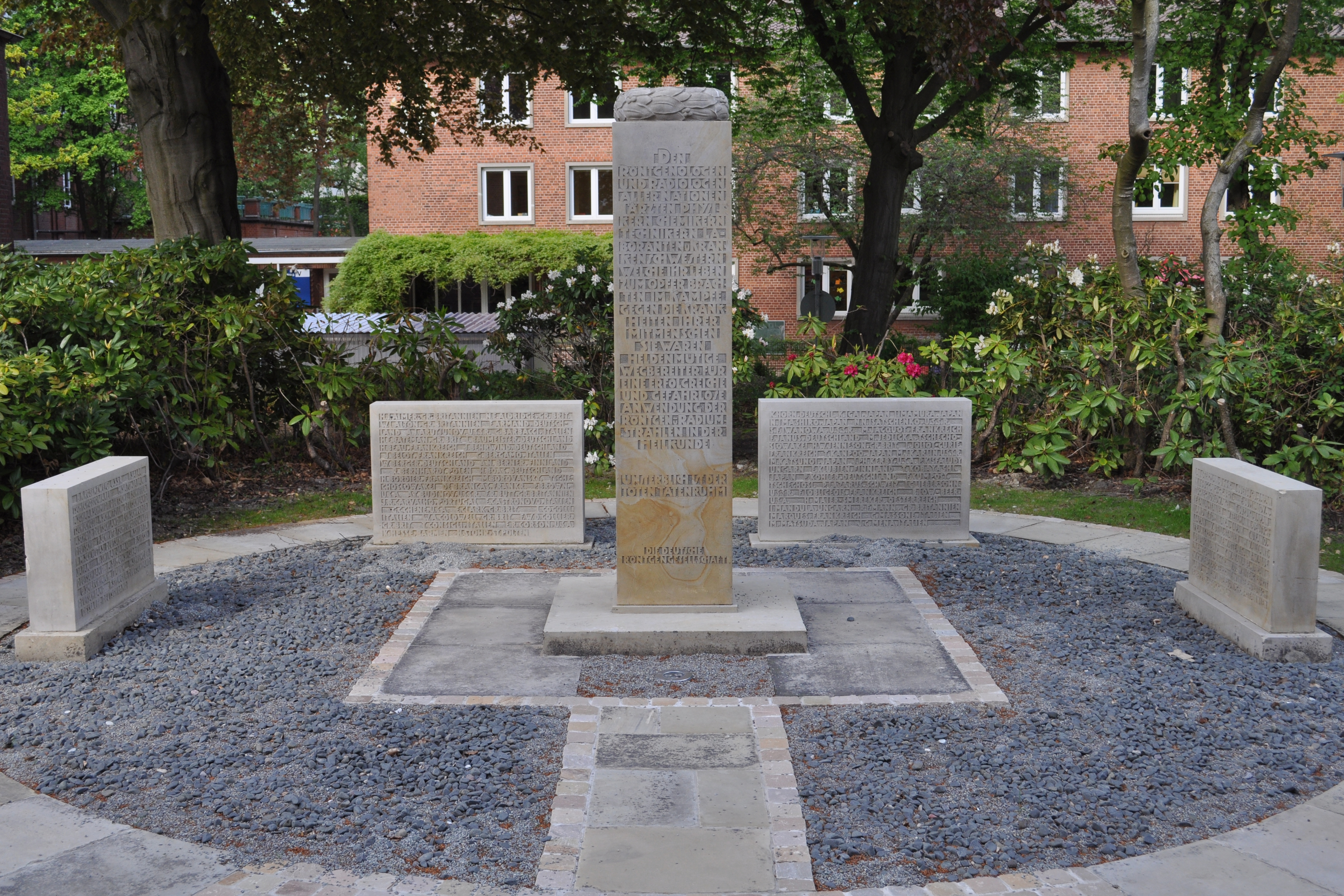
Monument to the X-ray and Radium Martyrs of All Nations erected 1936 at St. Georg hospital in Hamburg, commemorating 359 early radiology workers.

A year after Röntgen's discovery of X-rays in 1895, the American engineer Wolfram Fuchs gave what was probably the first radiation protection advice, but many early users of X-rays were initially unaware of the hazards and protection was rudimentary or non-existent.

The dangers of radioactivity and radiation were not immediately recognized. The discovery of X‑rays had led to widespread experimentation by scientists, physicians, and inventors, but many people began recounting stories of burns, hair loss and worse in technical journals as early as 1896. In February 1896 Professor Daniel and Dr. Dudley of Vanderbilt University performed an experiment involving X-raying Dudley's head that resulted in his hair loss. A report by Dr. H.D. Hawks, a graduate of Columbia College, of his suffering severe hand and chest burns in an x-ray demonstration, was the first of many other reports in Electrical Review.

Many experimenters including Elihu Thomson at Thomas Edison's lab, William J. Morton, and Nikola Tesla also reported burns. Elihu Thomson deliberately exposed a finger to an X-ray tube over a period of time and suffered pain, swelling, and blistering. Other effects, including ultraviolet rays and ozone were sometimes blamed for the damage. Many physicians claimed that there were no effects from X-ray exposure at all.

=== Emergence of international standards – the ICR ===
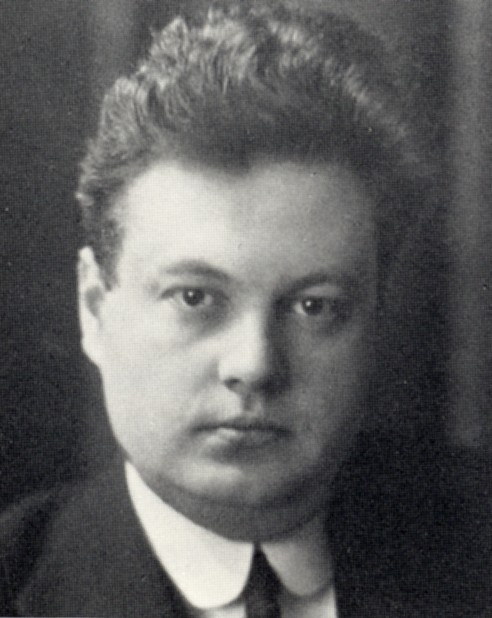
Rolf Maximilian Sievert, pioneer in the science of radiological protection and first chairman of the IXRPC.

Wide acceptance of ionizing radiation hazards was slow to emerge, and it was not until 1925 that the establishment of international radiological protection standards was discussed at the first International Congress of Radiology (ICR).

The second ICR was held in Stockholm in 1928 and the ICRU proposed the adoption of the roentgen unit; and the 'International X-ray and Radium Protection Committee' (IXRPC) was formed. Rolf Sievert was named Chairman, and a driving force was George Kaye of the British National Physical Laboratory.

The committee met for just a day at each of the ICR meetings in Paris in 1931, Zurich in 1934, and Chicago in 1937. At the 1934 meeting in Zurich, the Commission was faced with undue membership interference. The hosts insisted on having four Swiss participants (out of a total of 11 members), and the German authorities replaced the Jewish German member with another of their choice. In response to this, the Commission decided on new rules in order to establish full control over its future membership.

=== Birth of ICRP ===
After World War II the increased range and quantity of radioactive substances being handled as a result of military and civil nuclear programmes led to large additional groups of occupational workers and the public being potentially exposed to harmful levels of ionising radiation.

Against this background, the first post-war ICR convened in London in 1950, but only two IXRPC members were still active from pre-war days; Lauriston Taylor and Rolf Sievert. Taylor was invited to revive and revise the IXRPC, which included renaming it as the International Commission on Radiological Protection (ICRP). Sievert remained an active member, Sir Ernest Rock Carling (UK) was appointed as Chairman, and Walter Binks (UK) took over as Scientific Secretary because of Taylor's concurrent involvement with the sister organisation, ICRU.

At that meeting, six sub-committees were established:

- permissible dose for external radiation
- permissible dose for internal radiation
- protection against X rays generated at potentials up to 2 million volts
- protection against X rays above 2 million volts, and beta rays and gamma rays
- protection against heavy particles, including neutrons and protons
- disposal of radioactive wastes and handling of radioisotopes

The next meeting was in 1956 in Geneva. This was the first time that a formal meeting of the Commission took place independently of the ICR. At this meeting, ICRP became formally affiliated with the World Health Organization (WHO) as a 'participating non-governmental organisation'.

In 1959, a formal relationship was established with the International Atomic Energy Agency (IAEA), and subsequently with UNSCEAR, the International Labour Office (ILO), the Food and Agriculture Organization (FAO), the International Organization for Standardization (ISO), and UNESCO.

At the meeting in Stockholm in May 1962, the Commission also decided to reorganise the committee system in order to improve productivity and four committees were created:

- C1: Radiation effects;
- C2: Internal exposure;
- C3: External exposure;
- C4: Application of recommendations

After many assessments of committee roles within an environment of increasing workloads and changes in societal emphasis, by 2008 the committee structure had become:

- Committee 1 - Radiation effects Committee
- Committee 2 - Doses from radiation exposure
- Committee 3 - Protection in medicine
- Committee 4 - Application of the Commission's recommendations
- Committee 5 - Protection of the environment

== Evolution of recommendations ==
The key output of the ICRP and its historic predecessor has been the issuing of recommendations in the form of reports and publications. The contents are made available for adoption by national regulatory bodies to the extent that they wish.

Early recommendations were general guides on exposure and thereby dose limits, and it was not until the nuclear era that a greater degree of sophistication was required.

=== 1951 recommendations ===
In the "1951 Recommendations" the commission recommended a maximum permissible dose of 0.5 roentgen (0.0044 grays) in any 1 week in the case of whole-body exposure to X and gamma radiation at the surface, and 1.5 roentgen (0.013 grays) in any 1 week in the case of exposure of hands and forearms. Maximum permissible body burdens were given for 11 nuclides. At this time it was first stated that the purpose of radiological protection was that of avoiding deterministic effects from occupational exposures, and the principle of radiological protection was to keep individuals below the relevant thresholds.

A first recommendation on restrictions of exposures of members of the general public appeared in the commission's part of the 1954 Recommendations. It was also stated that 'since no radiation level higher than the natural background can be regarded as absolutely "safe", the problem is to choose a practical level that, in the light of present knowledge, involves a negligible risk'. However, the Commission had not rejected the possibility of a threshold for stochastic effects. At this time the rad and rem were introduced for absorbed dose and RBE-weighted dose respectively.

At its 1956 meeting the concept of a controlled area and radiation safety officer were introduced, and the first specific advice was given for pregnant women.

=== "Publication 1" ===
In 1957, there was pressure on ICRP from both the World Health Organisation and UNSCEAR to reveal all of the decisions from its 1956 meeting in Geneva. The final document, the Commission's 1958 Recommendations was the first ICRP report published by Pergamon Press. The 1958 Recommendations are usually referred to as 'Publication 1'.

The significance of stochastic effects began to influence the commission's policy and a new set of recommendations was published as Publication 9 in 1966. However, during development its editors became concerned about the many different opinions on the risk of stochastic effects. The Commission therefore asked a working group to consider these, and their report, Publication 8 (1966), for the first time for the ICRP summarised the current knowledge about radiation risks, both somatic and genetic. Publication 9 then followed, and substantially changed radiation protection emphasis by moving from deterministic to stochastic effects.

=== Reference man ===
In October 1974, the official definition of Reference man was adopted by the ICRP: “Reference man is defined as being between 20-30 years of age, weighing 70 kg, is 170 cm in height, and lives in a climate with an average temperature of from 10 to 20 degrees C. He is a Caucasian and is a Western European or North American in habitat and custom.”

The reference man was created for the estimation of radiation doses without adverse health effects.

=== Principles of protection ===
In 1977 Publication 26 set out the new system of dose limitation and introduced the three principles of protection:

- no practice shall be adopted unless its introduction produces a positive net benefit
- all exposures shall be kept as low as reasonably achievable, economic and social factors being taken into account
- the doses to individuals shall not exceed the limits recommended for the appropriate circumstances by the Commission

These principles have since become known as justification, optimisation (as low as reasonably achievable), and the application of dose limits. The optimisation principle was introduced because of the need to find some way of balancing costs and benefits of the introduction of a radiation source involving ionising radiation or radionuclides.

The 1977 Recommendations were very concerned with the ethical basis of how to decide what is reasonably achievable in dose reduction. The principle of justification aims to do more good than harm, and that of optimisation aims to maximise the margin of good over harm for society as a whole. They therefore satisfy the utilitarian ethical principle proposed primarily by Jeremy Bentham and John Stuart Mill. Utilitarians judge actions by their overall consequences, usually by comparing, in monetary terms, the relevant benefits obtained by a particular protective measure with the net cost of introducing that measure. On the other hand, the principle of applying dose limits aims to protect the rights of the individual not to be exposed to an excessive level of harm, even if this could cause great problems for society at large. This principle therefore satisfies the Deontological principle of ethics, proposed primarily by Immanuel Kant.

Consequently, the concept of the collective dose was introduced to facilitate cost–benefit analysis and to restrict the uncontrolled build-up of exposure to long-lived radio nuclides in the environment. With the global expansion of nuclear reactors and reprocessing it was feared global doses could again reach the levels seen from atmospheric testing of nuclear weapons. So, by 1977, the establishment of dose limits was secondary to the establishment of cost–benefit analysis and use of collective dose.

=== Re-evaluation of doses ===
During the 1980s, there were re-evaluations of the survivors of the atomic bombings of Hiroshima and Nagasaki, partly due to revisions in the dosimetry. The risks of exposure were claimed to be higher than those used by ICRP, and pressures began to appear for a reduction in dose limits.

By 1989, the commission had itself revised upwards its estimates of the risks of carcinogenesis from exposure to ionising radiation. The following year, it adopted its 1990 Recommendations for a 'system of radiological protection'. The principles of protection recommended by the Commission were still based on the general principles given in Publication 26. However, there were important additions which weakened the link to cost benefit analysis and collective dose, and strengthened the protection of the individual, which reflected changes in societal values:

- No practice involving exposures to radiation should be adopted unless it produces sufficient benefit to the exposed individuals or to society to offset the radiation detriment it causes. (The justification of a practice)
- In relation to any particular source within a practice, the magnitude of individual doses, the number of people exposed, and the likelihood of incurring exposures where these are not certain to be received should all be kept as low as reasonably achievable, economic and social factors being taken into account. This procedure should be constrained by restrictions on the doses to individuals (dose constraints), or on the risks to individuals in the case of potential exposures (risk constraints) so as to limit the inequity likely to result from the inherent economic and social judgements. (The optimisation of protection)
- The exposure of individuals resulting from the combination of all the relevant practices should be subject to dose limits, or to some control of risk in the case of potential exposures. These are aimed at ensuring that no individual is exposed to radiation risks that are judged to be unacceptable from these practices in any normal circumstances.

=== 21st century ===
In the 21st century, the latest overall recommendations on an international system of radiological protection appeared. ICRP Publication 103 (2007), after two phases of international public consultation, has resulted in more continuity than change. Some recommendations remain because they work and are clear, others have been updated because understanding has evolved, some items have been added because there has been a void, and some concepts are better explained because more guidance is needed.

== Radiation quantities ==
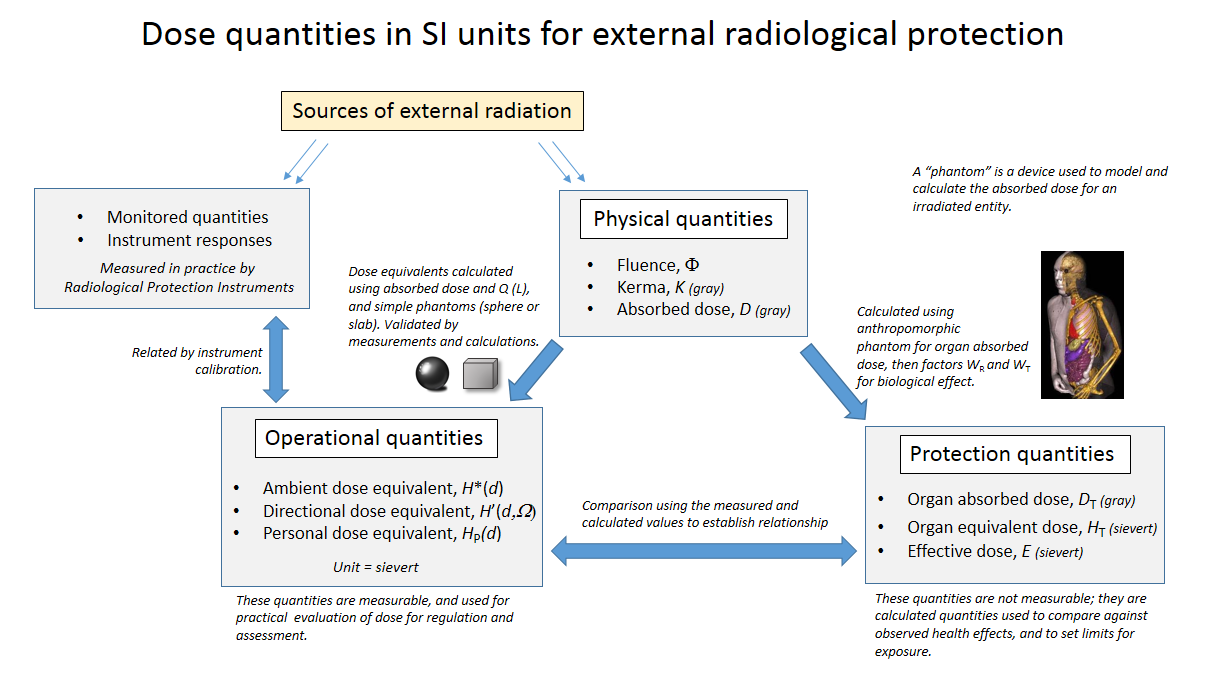
External dose quantities used in radiation protection and dosimetry based on ICRU 57, jointly developed with the ICRP

In collaboration with the ICRU, the commission has assisted in defining the use of many of the dose quantities in the accompanying diagram.

The table below shows the number of different units for various quantities and is indicative of changes of thinking in world metrology, especially the movement from cgs to SI units.

Ionizing radiation related quantities
Quantity	Unit	Symbol	Derivation	Year	SI equivalent
Activity (A)	becquerel	Bq	s^{−1}	1974	SI unit
Activity (A)	curie	Ci	3.7×10^{10} s^{−1}	1953	3.7×10^{10} Bq
Activity (A)	rutherford	Rd	10^{6} s^{−1}	1946	1000000 Bq
Exposure (X)	coulomb per kilogram	C/kg	C⋅kg^{−1} of air	1974	SI unit
Exposure (X)	röntgen	R	esu / 0.001293 g of air	1928	2.58×10^{−4} C/kg
Absorbed dose (D)	gray	Gy	J⋅kg^{−1}	1974	SI unit
Absorbed dose (D)	erg per gram	erg/g	erg⋅g^{−1}	1950	1.0×10^{−4} Gy
Absorbed dose (D)	rad	rad	100 erg⋅g^{−1}	1953	0.010 Gy
Equivalent dose (H)	sievert	Sv	J⋅kg^{−1} × W_{R}	1977	SI unit
Equivalent dose (H)	röntgen equivalent man	rem	100 erg⋅g^{−1} × W_{R}	1971	0.010 Sv
Effective dose (E)	sievert	Sv	J⋅kg^{−1} × W_{R} × W_{T}	1977	SI unit
Effective dose (E)	röntgen equivalent man	rem	100 erg⋅g^{−1} × W_{R} × W_{T}	1971	0.010 Sv

Although the United States Nuclear Regulatory Commission permits the use of the units curie, rad, and rem alongside SI units, the European Union European units of measurement directives required that their use for "public health ... purposes" be phased out by 31 December 1985.

== Awards ==
ICRP issues two awards the Bo Lindell Medal which is awarded annually and the Gold Medal for Radiation Protection which is issued by IRPA every four years since 1962.

=== Gold Medal for Radiation Protection ===
The recipients of the gold medal for Radiation Protection are listed below:

- 2020: Dale Preston
- 2016: Ethel Gilbert
- 2012: Keith Eckerman
- 2008: K Sankaranarayanan
- 2004: Richard Doll
- 2000: Angelina Guskova
- 1993: I Shigematsu
- 1989: Bo Lindell
- 1985: S Takahashi
- 1981: Edward E. Pochin
- 1973: Lauriston S. Taylor
- 1965: William Valentine Mayneord
- 1962: W Binks & Karl Z. Morgan

=== Bo Lindell Medal ===
The recipients of the Bo Lindell Medal for the Promotion of Radiological Protection are listed below:

- 2021: Haruyuki Ogino (Japan)
- 2019: Elizabeth Ainsbury (UK)
- 2018: Nicole E. Martinez (USA)

== See also ==
- Journal of Radiological Protection (JRP) -The peer-reviewed scientific publication devoted to radiological protection.
- gray (unit) - Physical dose unit, used for comparison of deterministic health effect
- Health Physics Society - USA professional body for radiological protection
- International Radiation Protection Association (IRPA) -The worldwide umbrella body for national radiological protection organisations
- International Commission on Radiation Units and Measurements - Devoted to the development and maintenance of international measurement standards and techniques
- National Council on Radiation Protection and Measurements of the United States
- sievert - Biological dose unit, used for comparison of stochastic health effect
- Society for Radiological Protection - the IRPA-affiliated national professional radiological protection organisation for UK
- William Herbert Rollins - Radiation protection pioneer, and the first to conduct controlled experiments into the hazards of X-rays.
