= Thurstan Holland sign =

Pattern seen in radiologic examinations

The Thurstan Holland sign or fragment, also known as the shiny corner sign, is the small metaphyseal triangular portion of bone carried with the physis in type II and IV Salter–Harris fractures. The sign was named after the Liverpool pioneer in radiology, Charles Thurstan Holland (1863–1941).
