= Charles Thurstan Holland =

English radiologist (1863–1941)

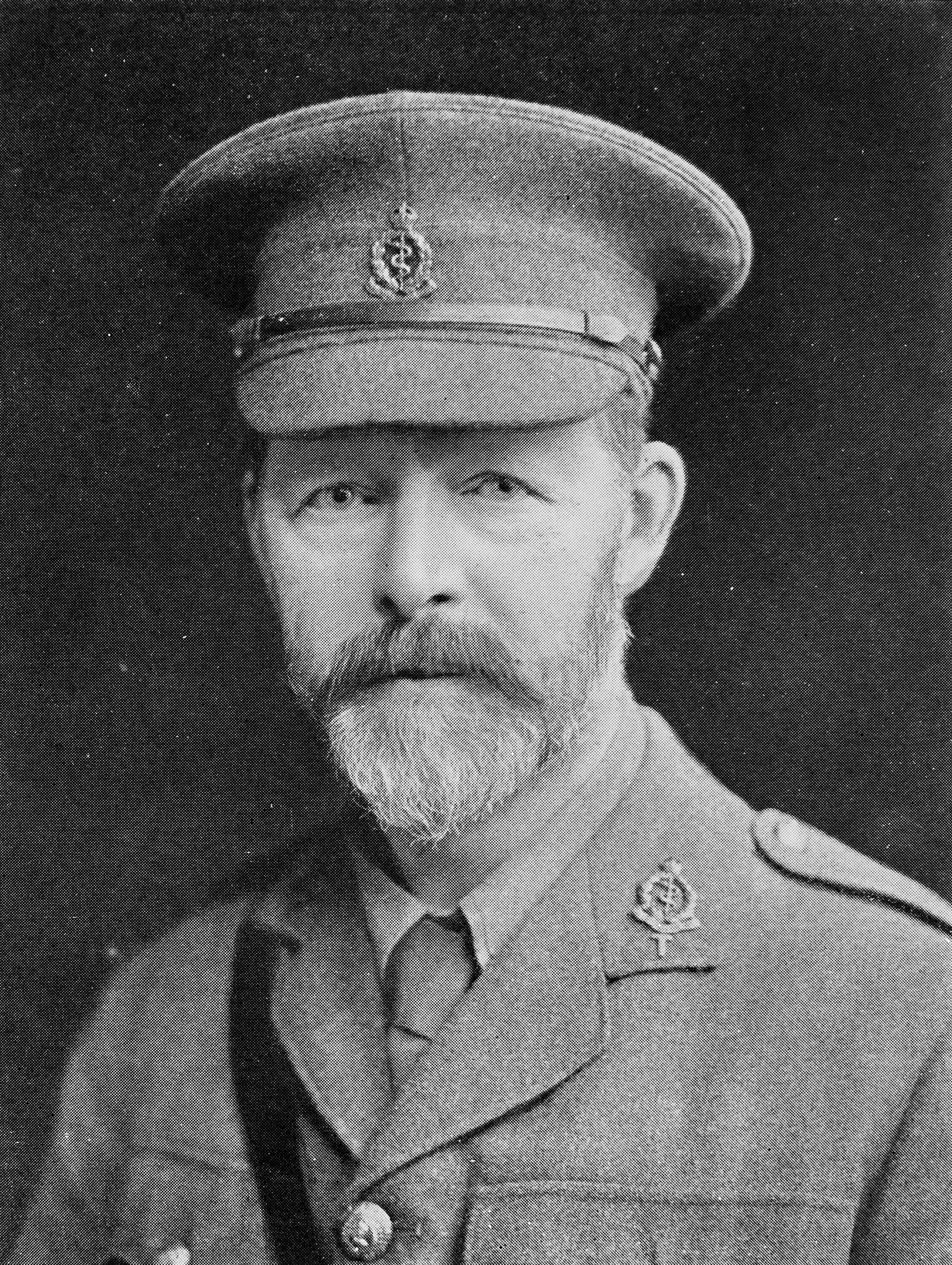
- Holland in 1932
- Born: March 1863; Bridgwater, Somerset, England
- Died: 16 January 1941 (aged 77); Liverpool, Merseyside, England
- Occupation: general practitioner
- Years active: 1896–1941
- Known for: Pioneer in radiology

Charles Thurstan Holland (Note: Thurstan is often misspelled as "Thurston".) TD DL FRCS (March 1863 – 16 January 1941) was an English general practitioner in Liverpool who was best known by his pioneering research in the field of radiology. The Thurstan Holland sign is named after him.

== Life ==
Charles Thurstan Holland was born in March 1863 at Bridgwater, Somerset, to William Thomas Holland and his wife, Florence Holland (née Florence Du Val), the second daughter of painter Charles Allen Du Val.

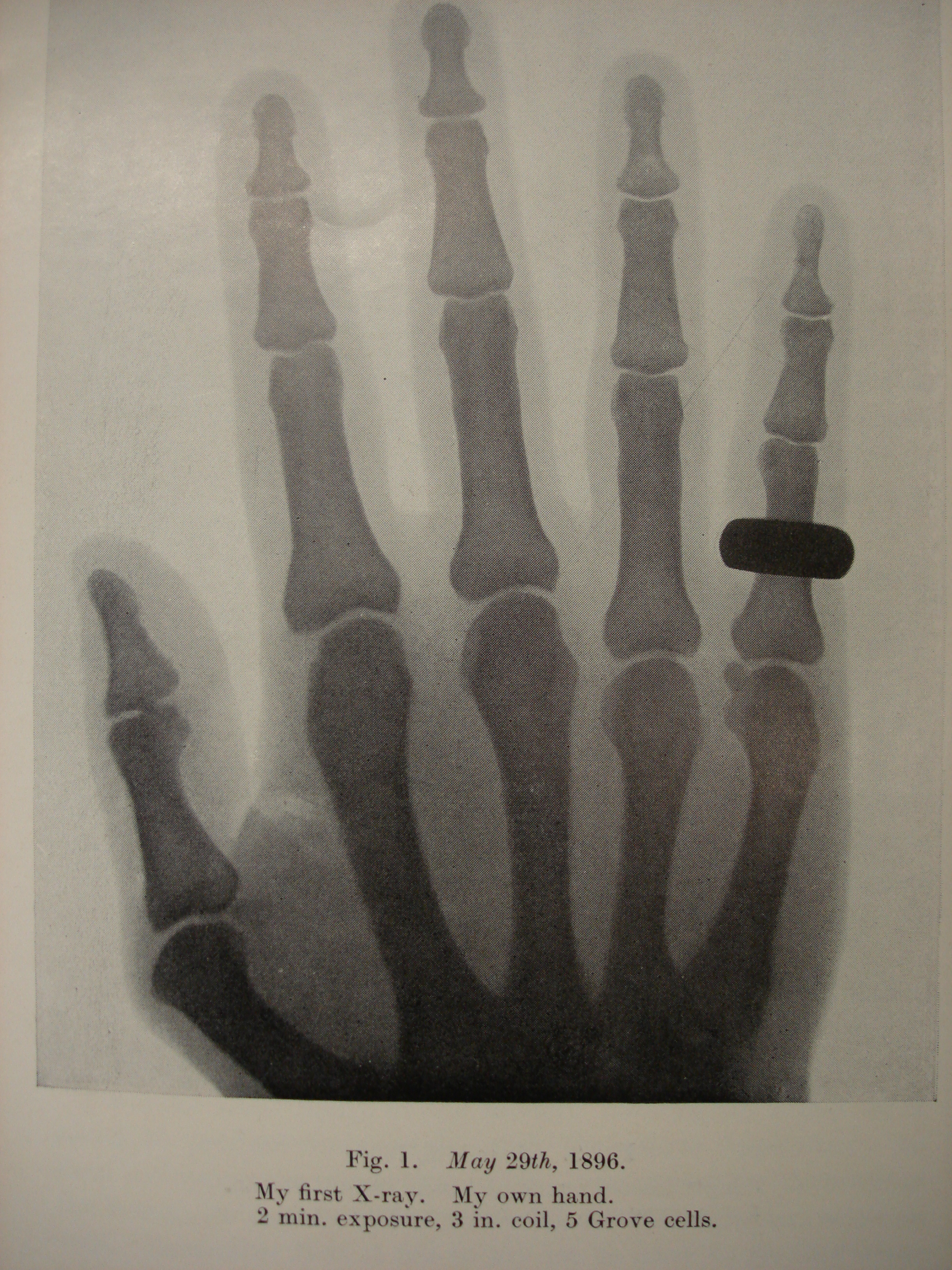
First X-ray taken by Holland, of his own hand. (Liverpool, 1896)

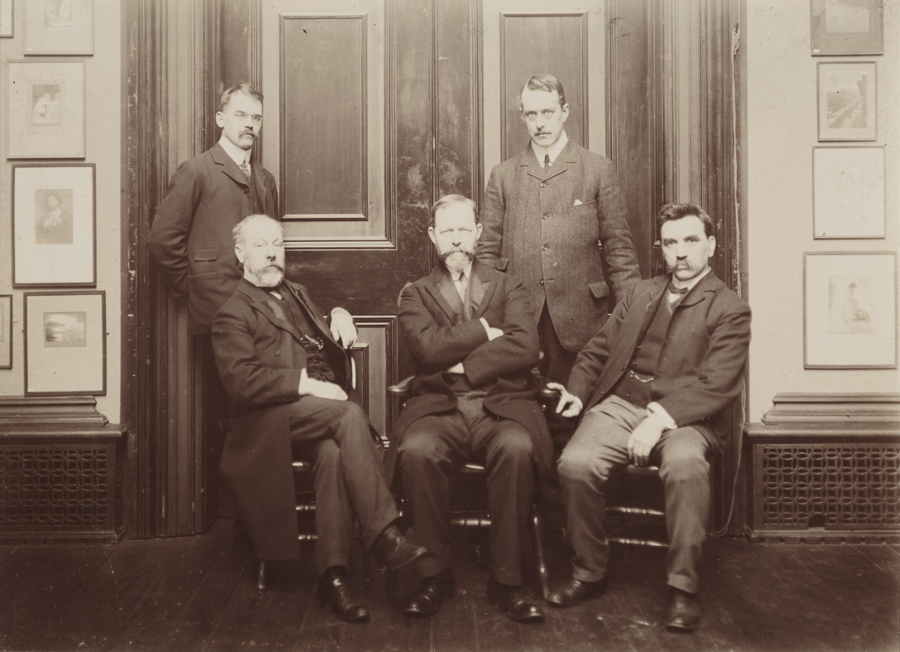
Holland (sitting in the middle) and friends at the Northern Photographic Exhibition, Liverpool (1908)

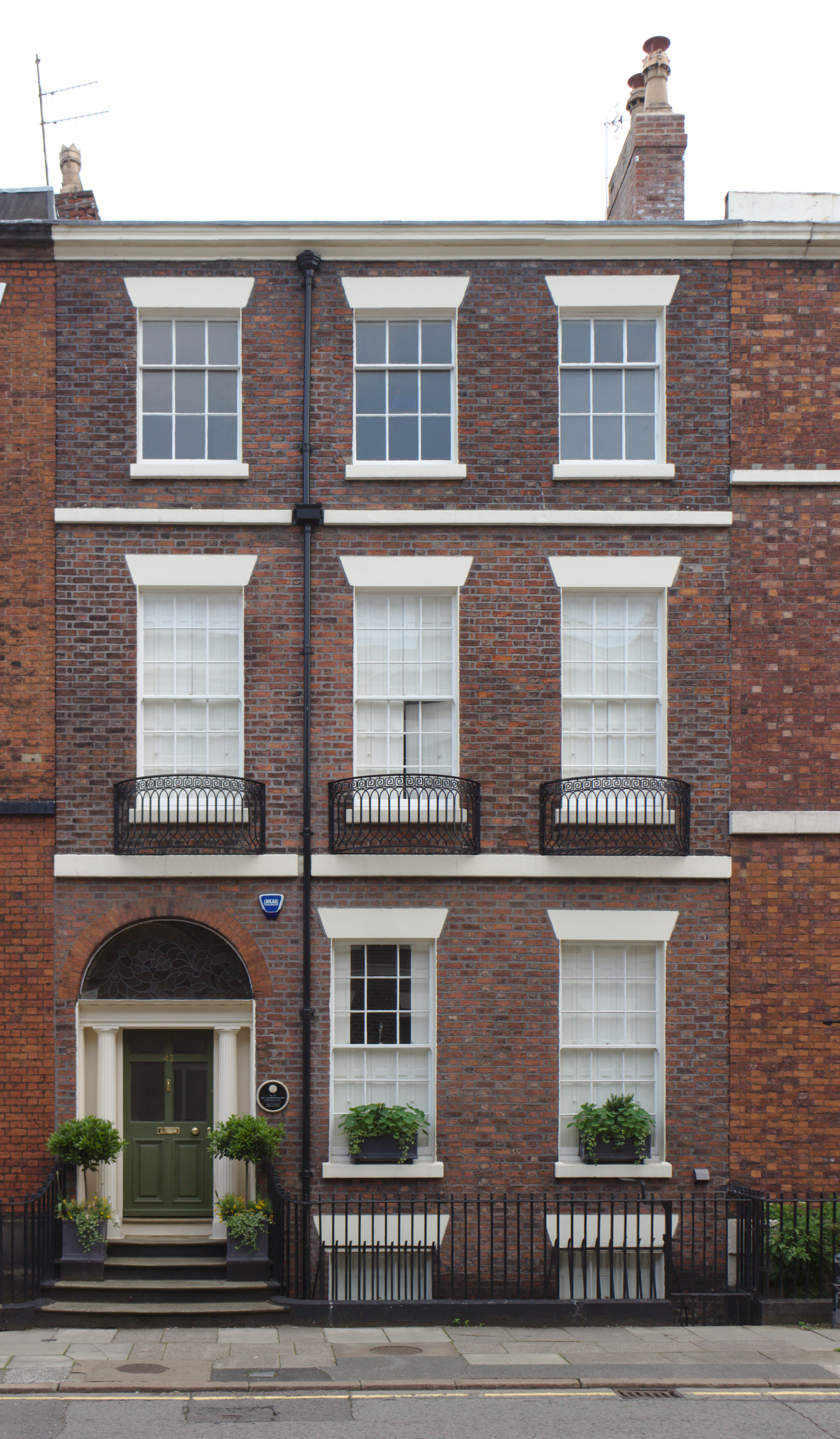
House where Thurstan lived at 43 Rodney Street, Liverpool

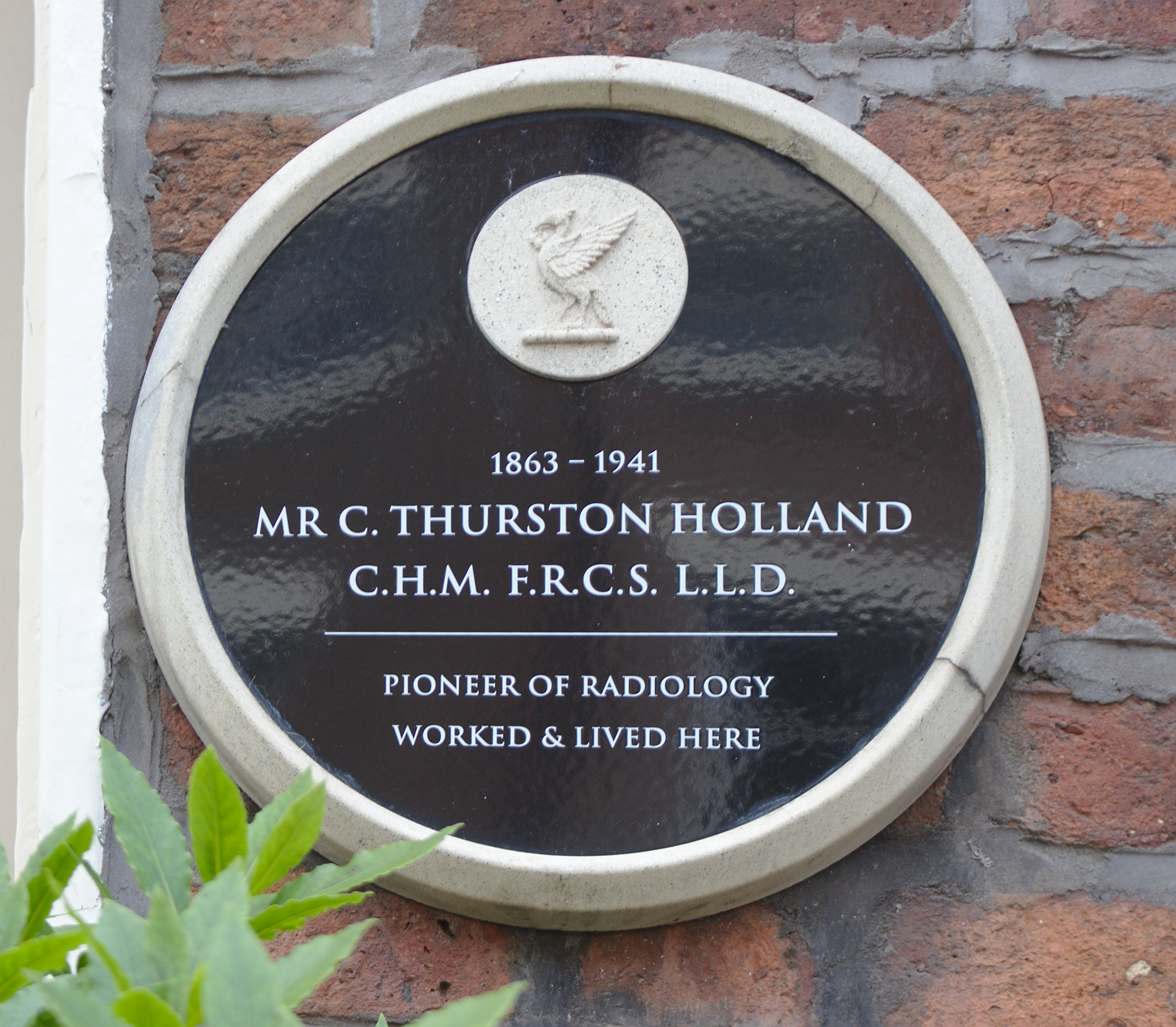
Plaque in front of the house, note the incorrect spelling of "Thurstan"

He studied medicine at the University College London, qualifying in 1888. From October 1896 to 1904 he was honorary radiologist to the Royal Liverpool Hospital and from 1904 to 1923 to the Liverpool Royal Infirmary.

He started research on radiology in 1896, after reading about Wilhelm Röntgen's experiments in this field. Thanks to his meticulous work and advancements in his technique, Holland was able to produce radiographs that were far in advance for many years, compared to the standard practice. Along with such names as Heinrich Albers-Schönberg (Germany), Antoine Béclère (France), Etienne Henrard (Belgium), Guido Holzknecht and Robert Kienböck (Austria), Thurstan Holland is considered one of the pioneers in Europe.

Holland took part in the First World War as a Major in the Royal Army Medical Corps, and his abilities as radiologist were invaluable in treating patients with bullets lodged in their bodies. By the end of the war, a number of proposals on how to measure the intensity of x-rays had been made, but there was little agreement between the various parties concerned. In 1925 the British Institute of Radiology, under Holland's leadership invited delegates from a number of countries to attend the First International Congress on Radiation in London. This congress set up a framework for future meetings — future congresses would meet every three years in a different country, and be organised by the host country.

Thurstan Holland was also a talented photographer, being elected the first president of the Lancashire and Cheshire Photographers' Society.

He died on 16 January 1941 in Liverpool.

== Publications and citations ==
=== 1890s ===
- Holland, C. T. (1894). Lancashire and Cheshire Branch: Registration of Midwives. British Medical Journal. 1(1744), 1223.
- Johnston, Francis & Holland, C. T. (1896). Two Cases of a Halfpenny in the Œsophagus. British Medical Journal. 2(1875), 1677.
- Holland, C. T. (1898). SHORT EXPOSURES IN PRACTICAL X RAY WORK. The Lancet. 151(3900), 1463–1464.
- Holland, C. T. (1899). Description of Plates: Plate LXIV.(b): Lupus of the Foot After Treatment: Treatment of Lupus by Roentgen Rays. Archives of the Roentgen Ray. 3(4), 112-114.
- Holland, C. T. (1899). Eczema Treated by X Rays. British Medical Journal. 1(2000), 1024.
- Holland, C. T. (1899). Description of Plates: Plate LXXVII: A Tumour of the Thigh. Archives of the Roentgen Ray. 4(2), 47-47.

=== 1900 - 1905 ===
- Holland, C. T. (1901). Notes on the Treatment of Lupus with X Rays. Archives of the Roentgen Ray. 5(4), 97-98.
- Holland, C. T. (1901). Description of Plates: Plate CXIV.(a): Bone in the Right Elbow. Archives of the Roentgen Ray. 5(4), 105-105.
- Holland's, C. T. (1901). Description of Plates: Plate CXVII.(b) and (c). Archives of the Roentgen Ray. 5(4), 106-106.
- Holland, C. T. (1901). Description of Plates: Plate CXX: Syphilitic Disease of the Radius. Archives of the Roentgen Ray. 6(1), 21-21.
- Newbolt, G. P., & Holland, C. T. (1901). TWO CASES ILLUSTRATING THE USE OF THE X RAYS IN SURGERY. The Lancet. 157(4045), 699-701.
- Holland, C. T. (1902). Description of Plates: Plate CXLIX.(b): Fragments of Needles in the Knee-Joint. Archives of the Roentgen Ray. 7(3), 53-53.
- Holland, C. T. (1903). Description of Plates: Plate CLIII.(a): Aortic Aneurism. Archives of the Roentgen Ray. 7(4), 70-70.
- Holland, C. T. (1903). X Rays at the Liverpool Hospitals. Archives of the Roentgen Ray. 7(7), 112-114.
- Holland, C. T. (1904). Note on the x-ray treatment of malignant growth. Archives of the Roentgen Ray. 8(12), 220-224.
- Holland, C. T. (1904). Description of Plate: Plate I: The Left and Right Kidney Regions: Plate A.(the Left) shows the Shadow of One Stone. Plate B.(the Right) shows the Shadow of Three Stones. Journal of the Röntgen Society. 1(2), 51-51.
- Holland, C. T. (1904). Description of Plates: Plate CCII: Radiograph of Chest, Showing Stricture of the Œsophagus (Taken after the Patient had Swallowed Two Ounces of Strong Bismuth Mixture). Archives of the Roentgen Ray. 9(6), 134-134.
- Holland, C. T. (1904). Exhibition of Radiographs Taken with a “Pressure Tube” Apparatus. Journal of the Röntgen Society. 1(2), 45-45.
- Holland, C. T. (1904). The Diagnostic Value of Skiagraphs in Renal Calculus. British Medical Journal. 2(2286), 1117.
- Holland, C. T. (1905). A Note on Sarcoma of Bone. Archives of the Roentgen Ray. 9(9), 187-188.
- Holland, C. T. (1905). Description of Plate: Plate X.: Malignant Growth of Right Forearm. Journal of the Röntgen Society. 1(4), 95-95.
- Holland, C. T. (1905). Description of Plates: Plate CCVIII.(Fig. 2): Sarcoma of Left Femur; Male, Aged Twenty-Two Years. Archives of the Roentgen Ray. 9(9), 207-207.

=== 1906 - 1909 ===
- Holland, C. T. (1906). A Case of Gall-Stones with Radiograph. Archives of the Roentgen Ray. 10(9), 242-243.
- Holland, C. T. (1906). ON THE X RAY DIAGNOSIS OF KIDNEY STONES. The Lancet. 167(4318), 1527-1531.
- Holland, C. T. (1906). On the use of the diaphragm compressor. Archives of the Roentgen Ray. 10(9), 241-242.
- Holland, C. T. (1907). Some difficulties in the x-ray diagnosis of renal calculus. Archives of the Roentgen Ray. 12(3), 61-65.
- Holland, C. T. (1907). Description of Plates: Plates CCLXX., CCLXXI, CCLXXII.(Figs. 1 to 12). Archives of the Roentgen Ray. 12(3), 88-88.
- Holland, C. T. (1908). The Berlin Roentgen Congress. Archives of the Roentgen Ray. 13(1), 13-14.
- Holland, C. T. (1908). The X-ray Treatment of Exophthalmic Goitre. Archives of the Roentgen Ray. 13(2), 39-41.
- Holland, C. T. (1908). PELVIC “BLOTCHES” AND THE ROENTGEN RAYS. British Medical Journal. 2(2502), 1781-1781.
- Holland, C. T., Barclay, A. E., & Hertz, A. F. (1908). Discussion On The Use Of Bismuth In The Diagnosis Of Conditions Of The Oesophagus And Stomach. The British Medical Journal. 711-716.
- Holland, C. T. (1909). The x-ray examination of the thorax. Archives of the Roentgen Ray. 14(7), 205-210.
- Holland, C. T. (1909). Tooth-Plate in the Œsophagus. Archives of the Roentgen Ray. 13(12), 327-328.
- Holland, C. T. (1909). Short Exposures in Kidney Work with a Mercury Break. Archives of the Roentgen Ray. 13(8), 196-197.

=== 1910 - 1914 ===
- Holland, C. T. (1910). Points in the diagnosis of ureteral calculi. Proceedings of the Royal Society of Medicine. 3(Electro Ther Sect), 87.
- Holland, C. T. (1910). A screen for examination in the upright position. The British Medical Journal. 514-515.
- Holland, C. T. (1911). Exposure in the X-ray Examination of the Kidney Region. Archives of the Roentgen Ray. 16(4), 132-133.
- Holland, C. T. (1911). A Note on the X-ray Appearances in Certain Cases of Hour-Glass Stomach. Archives of the Roentgen Ray. 15(11), 416-417.
- Holland, C. T. (1911). Description of Plates: Plate CCCLIX: Hour-Glass Stomach. Archives of the Roentgen Ray. 15(11), 440-440.
- Holland, C. T. (1911). The X-ray Diagnosis of Subphrenic Abscess. Archives of the Roentgen Ray. 15(12), 451-453.
- Holland, C. T. (1911). Description of Plates: Plates CCCLXIX. and CCCLXX. Archives of the Roentgen Ray. 16(4), 160-160.
- Holland, C. T. (1911). Recent Developments in Pyelography. Archives of the Roentgen Ray. 15(10), 371-371.
- Holland, C. T. (1912). Plastic Radiography. Archives of the Roentgen Ray. 17(6), 207-207.
- Holland, C. T. (1912). The Roentgen Diagnosis of Calculus of the Bladder. Archives of the Roentgen Ray. 16(12), 458-463.
- Holland, C. T. (1913). Plastic Radiographs. Journal of the Röntgen Society. 9(34), 5-5.
- Holland, C. T. (1913). On the Statistics of the X-ray Examination for Stone. In Seventeenth International Congress of Medicine, London, Sect (Vol. 22, p. 87).
- Holland, C. T. (1913). Radiography in a Case of Hairball in the Stomach. Archives of the Roentgen Ray. 18(2), 46-47.
- Holland, C. T. (1913). A Method of Obtaining a Radiograph of the Stomach at any Particular Phase of its Contraction. Archives of the Roentgen Ray. 18(3), 98-98.
- Holland, C. T. (1914). A Hair-Ball in the Stomach. Archives of the Roentgen Ray. 18(10), 373-374.
- Holland, C. T. (1914). Description of Plates: Plate CCCCLV: Radiograph of a Large Needle in the Pharynx and Upper Oesophagus of a Pekingese Dog. Archives of the Roentgen Ray. 19(6), 234-234.
- Holland, C. T. (1914). Description of Plates: Plate CCCCLVI: Three Pieces of Glass in the Stomach of an Adult Female. Archives of the Roentgen Ray. 19(6), 234-234.
- Holland, C. T. (1914). On the Making of Small Bromide Prints from Large Negatives. Archives of the Roentgen Ray. 18(8), 304-307.

=== 1915 - 1919 ===
- Holland, C. T. (1915). On the x-ray work at the First Western Base Hospital. Archives of the Roentgen Ray. 19(9), 307-321.
- Holland, C. T. (1915). Uric Acid Stones Under The X Rays. British Medical Journal. 2(2860), 624.
- Holland, C. T. (1915). Stone in the Submaxillary Gland. Archives of Radiology and Electrotherapy. 20(1), 18-18.
- Holland, C. T. (1916). A Note on Renal Calculi with an Account of an Interesting Case. Archives of Radiology and Electrotherapy. 21(3), 83-88.
- Holland, C. T. (1917). The Organization Of Military X-ray Work. British Medical Journal. 2(2959), 372.
- Holland, C. T. (1917). Röntgen Society. Archives of Radiology and Electrotherapy. 21(12), 397-403.
- HOLLAND, C. T. (1917). Report on the X-ray Examination of Dysentery and Other Cases. Ann. Trop. Med. Parasit. 10(4), 357-359.
- Holland, C. T. (1917). An Address ON RADIOLOGY IN CLINICAL MEDICINE AND SURGERY: Delivered to the Medical Students' Debating Society at the University of Liverpool. British Medical Journal. 1(2931), 285.
- Holland, C. T. (1918). Two cases of rare deformity of feet and hands. Archives of Radiology and Electrotherapy. 22(8), 234-239.

=== 1920s ===
- Holland, C. T. (1920). X-ray Therapy: An Address to the Southport Medical Society, March, 1920. Archives of Radiology and Electrotherapy. 25(7), 199-214.
- Holland, C. T. (1920). Radiology: lessons of the war. Proceedings of the Royal Society of Medicine. 13(Electro Ther Sect), 57.
- Holland, C. T. (1920). An Address ON WAR LESSONS FOR RADIOLOGY: Delivered before the Electro-therapeutic Section of the Royal Society of Medicine. British Medical Journal. 1(3089), 353.
- Holland, C. T. (1921). Cervical Ribs. British Medical Journal. 2(3167), 418.
- Holland, C. T. (1921). An Address On The Hour-Glass Stomach. British Medical Journal. 1(3131), 6.
- Holland, C. T. (1922). Note on sacralization of the fifth lumbar vertebra. J Bone Joint Surg Am. 4(2), 215-219.
- Holland, C. T. (1923). X-rays and Diagnosis. Journal of the Röntgen Society. 19(76), 123-147.
- Jones, H. Wallace, & Holland, C. T. (1923). A Case of Osteitis Deformans. Archives of Radiology and Electrotherapy. 28(1), 17-19.
- Holland, C. T., & Melville, S. (1925). 1st International Congress of Radiology, July 1925. Acta Radiologica. (6), 665-665.
- Holland, C. T., & Melville, S. (1926). First International Congress of Radiology, July, 1925. British Journal of Radiology: Röntgen Society Section. 22(86), 38-38.
- Holland, C. T., Barclay, A. E., & Batten, G. B. (1928). Robert Knox. The British Journal of Radiology. 1(10), 344-348.
- Williams, H., & Holland, C. T. (1928). An Unusual Case Of Ureteral Stone. British Medical Journal. 2(3535), 600-2.
- Holland, C. T. (1928). The accessory bones of the foot. The Robert Jones Birthday Volume, 157.
- Holland, C. T. (1929). A radiographical note on injuries to the distal epiphyses of the radius and ulna. Proceedings of the Royal Society of Medicine. 22(5), 695.
- Holland, C. T. (1929). Radium—A Warning. The British Journal of Radiology. 2(23), 501-505.

=== 1930s ===
- Holland, C. T. (1933). Sir Robert Jones, Bart. The British Journal of Radiology. 6(62), 116-116.
- Holland, C. T. (1933). George Hook Rodman, MD. The British Journal of Radiology. 6(67), 436-436.
- Holland, C. T., & Barclay, A. E. (1933). Robert Craig Rodgers, DMRE (Liverpool), MRCS (Engd.), LRCP (Lond.). The British Journal of Radiology. 6(69), 566-566.
- Girdlestone, G. R., & Holland, C. T. (1933). A Rare Ossification in the Lumbo-Sacral Region. The British Journal of Radiology. 6(70), 621-624.
- Holland, C. T. (1934). The Benign Giant-Cell Tumour of Bone. The British Journal of Radiology. 7(76), 227-232.
- Holland, C. T. (1938). X rays in 1896. The British Journal of Radiology. 11(121), 1-24.
