= CRadP =

Chartered Radiation Protection Professional is a professional designation and title, used initially in the United Kingdom from January 2008, for scientists who work in the field of radiation protection.

The grant, in the UK, of a Royal charter in January 2008 to the Society for Radiological Protection (SRP) "assists the Society in its aim to strengthen, maintain and promote standards of competence and recognition of professional progression within the field of radiation protection by enabling qualifying members to use the title “Chartered Radiation Protection Professional”, and the post-nominal letters - (CRadP), subject to the laws of the Society".
