= Charles Allen Duval =

English painter (1810–1872)

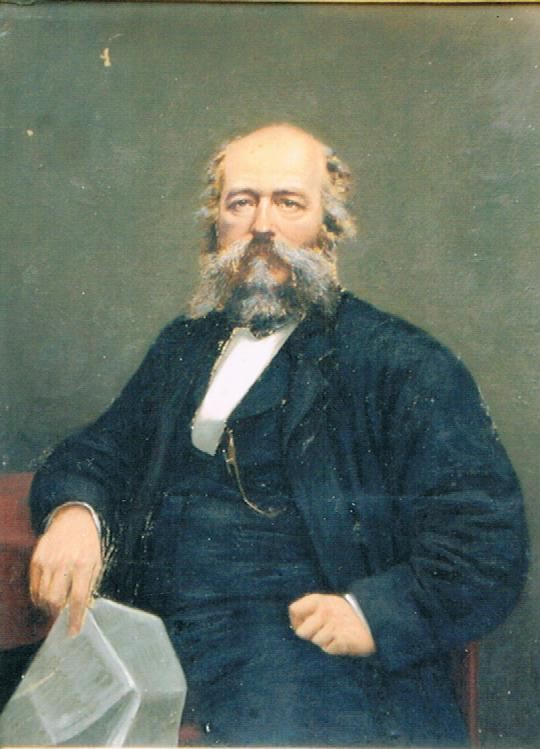
- Self Portrait
- Born: 19 March 1810; Beaumaris, Anglesey, Wales
- Died: 14 June 1872 (aged 62); Bollin Fee, Cheshire, England
- Occupations: Portrait painter Photographer; Literary critic Illustrator; Writer
- Known for: Manchester Academy of Fine Arts; Manchester City Art Gallery; Art Treasures Exhibition, Manchester 1857

Charles Allen Duval, often spelled duVal or Du Val (19 March 1810 – 14 June 1872), was an English portrait painter, photographer, literary critic, illustrator and writer from the Victorian era.

He was known for contributions to Manchester's art scene, including the Manchester Academy of Fine Arts, the Manchester City Art Gallery and the Art Treasures Exhibition, Manchester 1857.

== Life ==
Duval was born in Beaumaris, Anglesey, Wales, on 19 March 1810. His parents were Edward Octavius Caesar Wall duVal and Sarah Eskildson After some time at sea, he started his artistic career in Liverpool. He married Elizabeth Renney in both Liverpool 1833 and Manchester 1834. They had nine children, two of whom; Edward and Gerald, became artists. Gerald's daughter Bessie Du Val also painted and illustrated books. His eldest son, Charles became a photographer and partner in his father's business, Messrs. C. A. Duval & Co., Exchange Street, Manchester. The firm was established in the 1860s and remained in business for forty years.

Duval's eldest daughter, Julia, married James Stanley Kipping, a Bank of England official, in 1860. Their eldest son, born 1863, was Frederic Stanley Kipping, noted for his pioneering work with silicones.

Duval's second daughter, Florence, married William Thomas Holland. Their son Charles Thurstan Holland (born 1863) would become famous for his research on Radiology.

Duval had studios in Liverpool, Manchester and London. In 1831 he sent his work to Liverpool Academy of Arts from the following address: 51 Lime Street, Liverpool and in 1832; 26 Russell Street, Liverpool. He also opened a studio on the Isle of Man where he spent his summers.

In 1833 Duval left Liverpool and moved to Manchester where his address was 74 York Street Manchester though he was still listed in the Liverpool Directory in 1841 at the same address as a Sara Duval. In 1842 – 24 Carlton Terrace, Greenheys, Manchester became the family home. He was employed by Messrs. Agnew & Zanetti, Art Dealer (later known as Thomas Agnew & Sons.)

In Manchester he founded the Art Academy, a society for holding annual exhibitions with the idea of establishing a permanent public gallery, and was its president for many years. Eventually his idea took permanent form in the rooms of the Royal Manchester Institution.

He was one of the first members to be elected to the Manchester Academy of Fine Arts in 1859 and was also one of the first members of the Brasenose Club along with Charles Halle and Edwin Waugh.

His colleague Alfred Darbyshire described Duval entering the Brasenose Club in the following way: "That distinguished looking man just entered the room, with the Scotch plaid around him, and in the act of removing his black sombrero, is C A Duval, the artist and fashionable portrait painter of the period.". Duval was also a member of the Portico Library, the Manchester Literary and Philosophical Society, the Manchester Athenaeum and for a time he was President of the Manchester Chess Club.

The first circular announcing the formation of the Manchester Etching Club contained the signatures of Sir Charles Halle, Alfred Waterhouse, Sir Henry Roscoe, Samuel Pope, Charles J J Hitchman, Edwin Waugh, H F Blair, Sir John Holker, Duval the painter and H M Acton.

He exhibited two pictures in the prestigious Art Treasures Exhibition, Manchester 1857 (429) 'Forgotten Vows' and (436) 'Recalled to Memory' and a portrait (643) of John L Kennedy in the Royal Jubilee Exhibition, Manchester 1887.

Duval exhibited for thirty-six years at the Royal Academy, London (1836–1872).

== Death ==
He was painting a family portrait in Alderley Edge when he was suddenly taken ill and he died at Bollin Fee, Nr. Wilmslow Cheshire on 14 June 1872.

The Dictionary of National Biography states "His portraits are good likenesses, and have considerable artistic merit particularly his chalk studies of children... All his work was marked by great taste and beauty."

== Works ==
The Ruined Gamester

One of his first works was The Ruined Gamester which was purchased and engraved by a Manchester print seller named Dewhurst. It became so popular that a cartoon in Punch caricaturing Sir Robert Peel was drawn from it, and an etching from the picture and accompanying verses both by the artist appeared in the North of England Magazine, June 1842.

The following etchings by Duval appeared in 'The North of England Magazine' vol 1, 1842:

- Dr Dalton, from the Chantrey Statue, p. 14
- The Resident Pupil's Supper, p. 35
- The Genius of Mesmerism Rescuing a 'Slave of the Ring,' p. 72
- The Real and the Ideal, p. 72
- Hulme Hall, p. 96
- The Ruined Gamester, p. 297

Some of his other well-known sitters were Charles Halle, Joseph Whitworth, Samuel Bough and the inventor Joseph Burch whose portrait is now in the Science Museum.

Duval painted an oil portrait of the inventor Joseph Burch (1825–1898) measuring 84 x 68.5 cm. It was commissioned by the Patent Museum and is now in the Science Museum store at Blythe House. Some of his inventions can also be seen at the Museum:

- Model of a drugget-printing machine, with accessories, patentee Joseph Burch, England 1843. (Inventory number 1860-10)
- (a) Machine for burning textile printing block moulds, 1845–1855; (b) Mould (unfinished); (c) Three cast printing blocks; (d) Collection of burning punches. (Inventory number 1979-378.)

For a comprehensive list of Duval's works see: the 'Arnold Hyde Dictionary' of local artists compiled in the 1930 at Manchester Art Gallery.

== Portraits ==
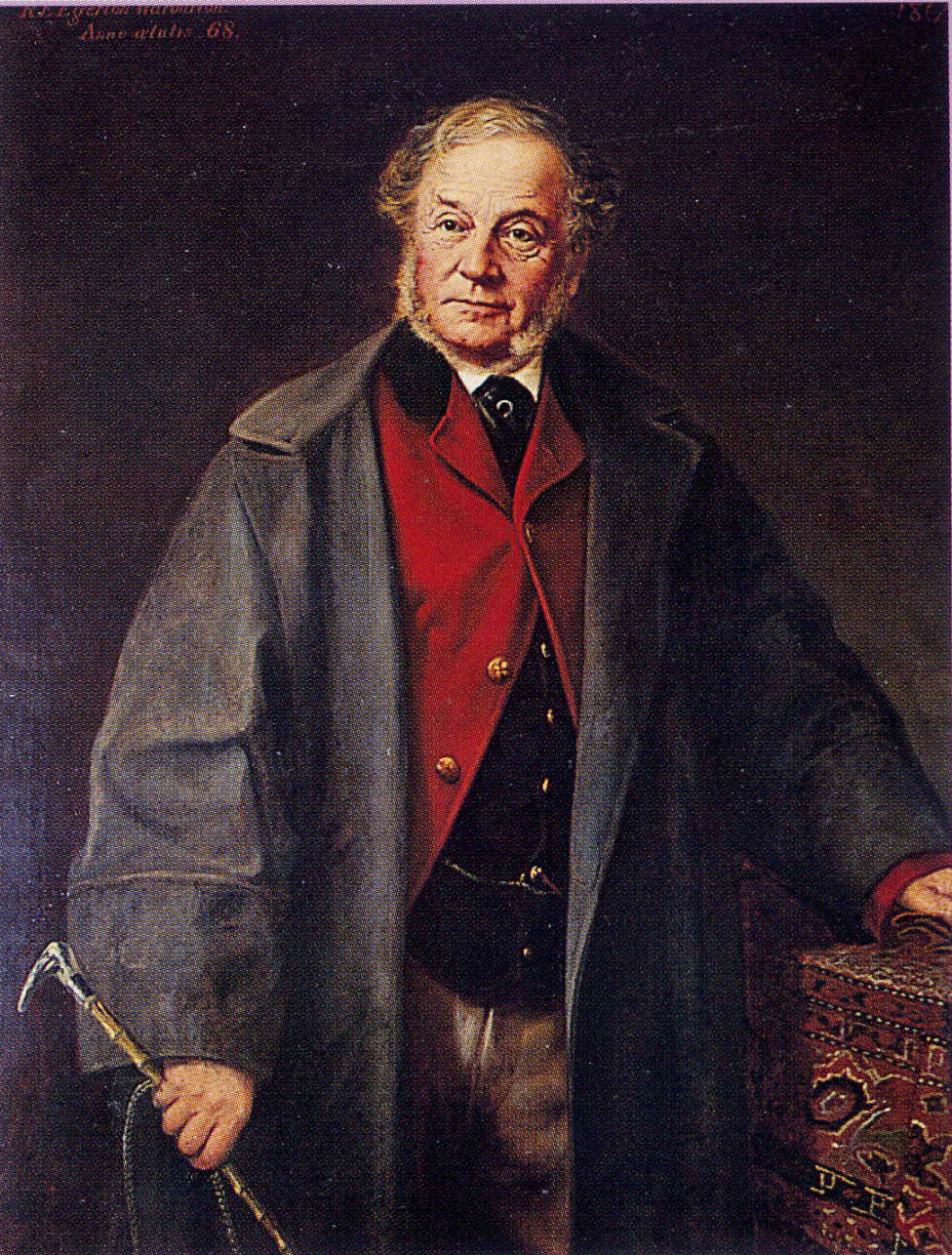
Rowland Egerton-Warburton

Many of the nobility commissioned portraits from Duval. Notably Rowland Eyles Egerton-Warburton, who built the present Arley Hall in Cheshire. Duval painted both Rowland's and his mother's portraits and they can be seen hanging in the elegant Drawing Room at Arley Hall.

== Pastels ==
His pastel portraits of both adults and children were in great demand. One of his well-known pastel portraits is of the three oldest daughters of the Manchester novelist Elizabeth Cleghorn Gaskell. The author's husband, William Gaskell was a Unitarian Minister in the city and first chairman of the Portico Library and would have been personally acquainted with Duval.

== Politicians ==
John Bright

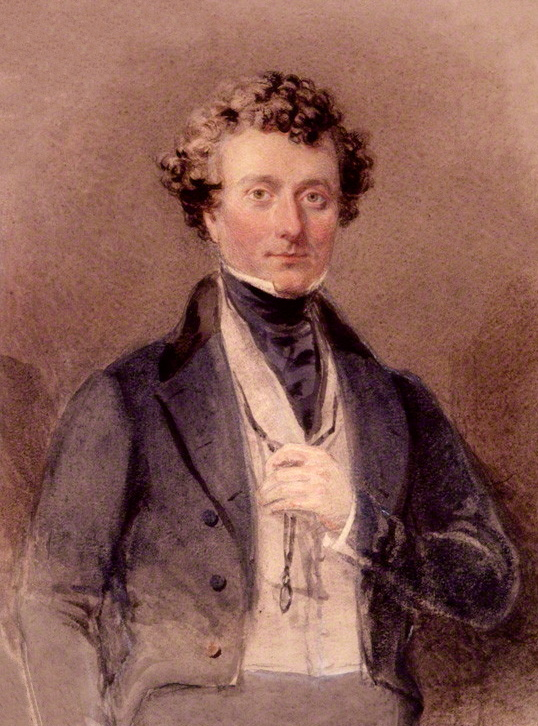
Thomas Milner Gibson

John Bright, Daniel O'Connell, Richard Cobden, and Charles Pelham Villiers were some of his political commissions. Daniel Lee, one of Duval's first patrons commissioned him to paint a life size painting of O'Connell, who allowed him one two and a half-hour sitting. Records show Cobden paid Duval £10.10.0. for his full-length portrait in 1853. All these portraits were worked in oil. Occasionally he worked in watercolour, for example Thomas Milner Gibson in the National Portrait Gallery.

He executed a series of water colour vignette portraits of the leading members of the Anti-Corn Law League, which were engraved and published, and reproduced on pocket handkerchiefs.

== Historical paintings ==
Duval painted numerous history paintings for example: The Methodist Centenary contained one hundred portraits of leading Wesleyans who had assembled in Manchester to celebrate the hundredth anniversary of the Institution of Methodism. Luther Burning the Pope's Bull also contained many figures. It measured 3m x 1.8m and was exhibited at Westminster Hall and afterwards in principal towns throughout the country.

A three-quarter length oil portrait of Thomas Michaelson, in the dress uniform of a cavalry officer, can be seen on the website of the Dock Museum Collection.

His family owned Michaelson House and Barrow Island, Barrow-in-Furness. His widow, Jane Michaelson sold Barrow Island to the Furness Railway in 1863. The Barrow Shipyard now Vickers Armstrong was sited on the island.

The museum are planning to conserve this painting.

In 1855 he exhibited Columbus in chains at the Royal Academy.

== Photography ==
In the 1860s Duval opened his own photography and portrait gallery at the premises of Messrs. Thomas Agnew & Sons, 14 Exchange Street, Manchester. He produced a full-page advertisement for the firm, which included the following paragraph: "Messrs C A Duval & Co trust that the special training and knowledge of the artist, combined with the skill of the photographer, will ensure results more satisfactory to the public than those hitherto realised by photographing alone." He then produced a list of all his techniques:

- Mr Duval's Miniature Portraits
- Oil And Water-Colour Vignetted Portraits
- Copies Of Pictures And Drawings Reduced Or Enlarged From The Original
- Album Groups And Portraits
- Instantaneous Portraits Of Children
- Crayon And Pastel Portraits
- Life Size Portraits In Oil

He ended his advertisement by stating: "Messrs C A Duval & Co will not exhibit a portrait without special permission."

Duval also produced right up to the minute Carte-de-visite portraits made popular by Queen Victoria. When Prince Albert died in 1861 over 70,000 portraits were sold within a week. Some of Duval's carte-de-visite portraits, for example: Joseph Whitworth, William Fairbairn, Charles Halle, James Whitehead, Richard Ansdell, Richard Cobden, Edward Stanley, 14th Earl of Derby and Prince Lee can be seen on the website of the National Portrait Gallery, London. By using Andre-Adolphe-Eugene Disderi's techniques Duval enabled the not so wealthy to afford their own portraits.

Many of his photographs, paintings and drawings were registered by C A Duval and Company at the Copyright Office and Stationer's Company between 1863-1864 and photographs of these works are in the collection of The National Archives (United Kingdom).

== Writing ==
In 1863 Duval published five pamphlets on the American Civil War. He also wrote satirical articles for periodicals which he illustrated with his own sketches.

== Sources ==
- Allen Vivien, Du Val Tonight! The Story of a Showman, Worcester: Square One Publications, p.p. 3,4.
- Art Treasures Examiner: A Record of the Art-Treasures Exhibition at Manchester, 1857.
- Dewsbury Sheila, Archivist, Manchester Academy of Fine Arts and author of The Story So Far: The Manchester Academy of Fine Arts from 1859–2003, MAFA, 2003.
- Graves A., A Century of Loan Exhibitions 1813–1912, 5 vols (1913–15.)
- Nicholson Albert, Duval Charles Allen (1808–1872) Oxford Dictionary of Natural Biography, Oxford University Press, 2004
- Quentin Bajac, The Invention of Photography: The First Fifty Years, 'New Horizons' series. London: Thames & Hudson, 2002.
- The Ruined Gamester, The North of England Magazine, Book 11, Chap 11, p. 297, 2002.

== Bibliography ==
- Susan W Thomson, Manchester's Victorian Art Scene And Its Unrecognised Artists, Chapter 2, Charles Allen Duval 1808–1872 Portrait Painter And Photographer,Manchester Art Press, 2007, p.p. 13–29. ISBN 978-0-9554619-0-3
