= Keith Halnan =

British oncologist and researcher (1920–2006)

Keith Halnan FRCR FRCP FRSE
- Born: 8 March 1920; London, England
- Died: 6 February 2006 (aged 85)
- Occupation: Physician

Academic background
- Education: University College Hospital, London

Academic work
- Discipline: Oncology; radiotherapy
- Institutions: University College Hospital; Christie Hospital; Royal Postgraduate Medical School, Hammersmith Hospital
- Main interests: Radioactive isotopes

Keith Edward Halnan (28 March 1920 – 6 February 2006) was a British oncologist and researcher in radiotherapy.

He first studied radioactive isotopes with the Medical Research Council (MRC) at University College Hospital (UCL), where he worked on radioactive iodine. He later became involved in establishing the Beatson Cancer Centre in Glasgow. From 1978 to 1985, he held the position of director of the Department of Radiotherapy and Oncology, Royal Postgraduate Medical School, Hammersmith Hospital, London.

In 1986, the Hong Kong Government Working Party on Postgraduate Medical Examination and Training appointed him their chair.

== Early life and education ==
Keith Halnan was born on 28 March 1920 in London. His father was the don Edward Thomas Halnan. He was educated at The Perse School, where he was head boy. Between 1938 and 1940 he studied natural sciences at St Catharine's College, Cambridge.

Halnan received training in a British Army Officer Cadet Training Unit before being commissioned as a second lieutenant in the Royal Corps of Signals on 26 August 1941. Halnan led an Infantry Brigade Signals Unit at the Battle of Kohima and the Burma campaign. He had been appointed to the temporary rank of captain by the time he was Mentioned in dispatches "in recognition of gallant and distinguished services in Burma" on 9 May 1946.

After the Second World War, Halnan returned to Cambridge and gained admission to study medicine at UCL, London, from where he graduated.

== Career ==
Halnan took to the specialty of oncology. He first studied radioactive isotopes with the MRC at UCL, where he worked on radioactive iodine with Edward Pochin. In 1957 he received his MD.

Between 1958 and 1966, he was posted at the Christie Hospital, Manchester. In 1967 he moved to Glasgow, where he later became involved in establishing the Beatson Cancer Centre and received the Fellowship of the Royal Society of Edinburgh. He remained there until 1978.

From 1978 to 1985, he held the position of director of the Department of Radiotherapy and Oncology, Royal Postgraduate Medical School, Hammersmith Hospital, London. In 1986, the Hong Kong Government Working Party on Postgraduate Medical Examination and Training appointed him their chair. There, he produced the "Halnan Report".

His book Treatment of cancer was published in 1982. In 1995, the Channel 4 documentary Deadly Experiments featured his 1950s study of giving iodine-132 to 25 healthy pregnant women, published in 1958. What happened to the mothers and babies is not known; no follow-up study was carried out.

== Death ==
He died on 6 February 2006 from metastatic cancer.

== Selected publications ==
=== Books ===
- Atomic Energy in Medicine. Butterworth's Scientific Publications. 1957.
- Treatment of Cancer. London: Chapman and Hall. 1982.

=== Articles ===
- HALNAN KE (November 1956). "Medical uses of radioiodine". Medical World. 85 (5): 424–428. PMID 13377858.
- Halnan, K. E.; Pochin, E. E. (January 1957). "Aspects of the radioiodine treatment of thyroid carcinoma". Metabolism: Clinical and Experimental. 6 (1): 49–62. ISSN 0026-0495. PMID 13386968. (Co-author)
- HALNAN KE (1958). "The radioiodine uptake of the human thyroid in pregnancy". Clinical Science. 17 (2): 281–290. ISSN 0009-9287. PMID 13537345.
- Halnan, K. E.; Pochin, E. E. (November 1958). "The Use of Iodine 132 for Thyroid Function Tests". The British Journal of Radiology. 31 (371): 581–588. doi:10.1259/0007-1285-31-371-581. ISSN 0007-1285. PMID 13596579.
- Halnan, Keith E. (October 1992). "The Hong Kong Academy of Medicine". Journal of the Royal College of Physicians of London. 26 (4): 442–444. ISSN 0035-8819. PMC 5375548. PMID 1432887.
