= Standard person =

The standard person or reference person is a theoretical model individual which has perfectly "normal" characteristics. This model is used in radiation safety. For many years, the standard person was called reference man because the work assumed a healthy, young adult Caucasian male.

== Official definition ==
According to the International Commission on Radiological Protection's 1974 definition in ICRP Publication 23, "Reference man is defined as being between 20–30 years of age, weighing 70 kg, is 170 cm in height, and lives in a climate with an average temperature of from 10°C to 20°C. He is a Caucasian and is a Western European or North American in habitat and custom."

== History ==
The Reference Individual of Radiation Protection, the 70-kg "standard man" representing a typical Western adult male, has been used in physiological models since at least the 1920s. The first "Standard Man" data were assembled by Mary Jane Cook as a "Survey Report of the Characteristics of the Standard Man" in 1948, and it remained unpublished. She worked for Oak Ridge National Laboratory to establish maximum permissible internal dose. Her data were presented at the Chalk River Laboratories Conference on Permissible Dose, September 29-30, 1949.

The ICRP-23 report from 1974 does not contain elemental data for a "Reference Woman"; Mary Jane Cook may have died in 1974 given the sentence “During the last few months of editing, the services of M. J. Cook were lost to the group.” In 1984, Committee 2 of the ICRP decided to update Publication for women and children. The revised Reference Man continued to be a Westerner, but world-wide anatomical data were reviewed and weight increased by 3 kg. In 1990 in vivo data provided first estimates of body composition for Reference Woman, along with variations on body size, age, and race.

The Institute for Energy and Environmental Research has argued in 2009, that reference man in radiation dose calculations underestimates dose to children in a large number of situations, and to women in some situations, resulting in an underestimation of cancer risk.

== Future ==
As of 1999 it was speculated that, eventually, for medical purposes, the concept may be replaced by effective attention to measuring the exposure of individual patients to radiation, as in precision medicine.

US native American tribes have suggested a standardized indigenous body designed for remediation planning, rejected by federal regulators. As of 2004 it was speculated that in the future, the model may be expanded to include selected plants and animals.

== See also ==
- Effective dose (radiation)
