= Dan Jacobo Beninson =

Argentine physicist (1931–2003)

Dan Jacobo Beninson (1931 – 2003) was an Argentine radiation expert who worked for the Argentine Atomic Energy Commission (CNEA) since 1955 holding different posts.

He chaired the institution from 1998 to 1999 and was a member of its board of directors in several opportunities. He was a member of INVAP Board of Directors from 1987 to 1989.

From 1974 to 1979, he was director of the Scientific Secretariat of the United Nations Scientific Committee on the Effects of Atomic Radiation (UNSCEAR). He was for many years a member of the International Commission on Radiation Protection (ICRP) which he chaired from 1985 to 1993.

Among the many awards conferred to him, we will only mention that he was honored with various national and international rewards; he received the Konex Award in 1983 and was named “Personality of the Year” in 1991 by the American Nuclear Society on account of his contributions. In 1998, he was awarded the República de Oro 1998 for his lifelong career.

In 2006 the Instituto de Tecnología Nuclear Dan Beninson was founded named after him.

== See also ==
- CNEA
