= International Radiation Protection Association =

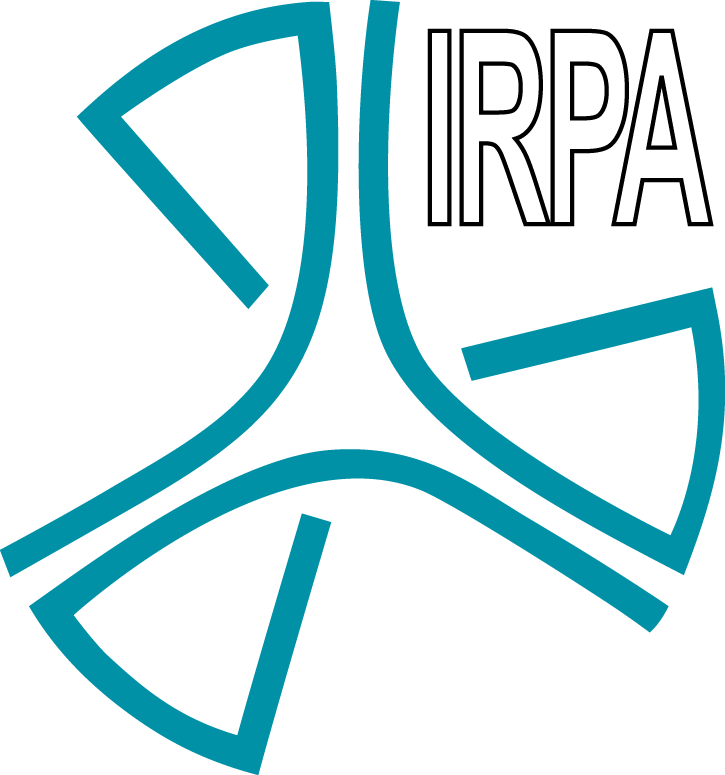
- Abbreviation: IRPA
- Formation: 19 June 1965
- Region served: Global
- President: Christopher Clement
- Vice-President: Ana Maria Bomben
- Website: www.irpa.net

The International Radiation Protection Association (IRPA) is an independent non-profit association of national and regional radiation protection societies, and its mission is to advance radiation protection throughout the world. It is the international professional association for radiation protection.

IRPA is recognized by the IAEA as a Non Governmental Organization (NGO) and is an observer on the IAEA Radiation Safety Standards Committee (RASSC).

IRPA was formed on June 19, 1965, at a meeting in Los Angeles; stimulated by the desire of radiation protection professionals to have a world-wide body. Membership includes 53 Associate Societies covering 68 countries, totaling approximately 18,000 individual members.

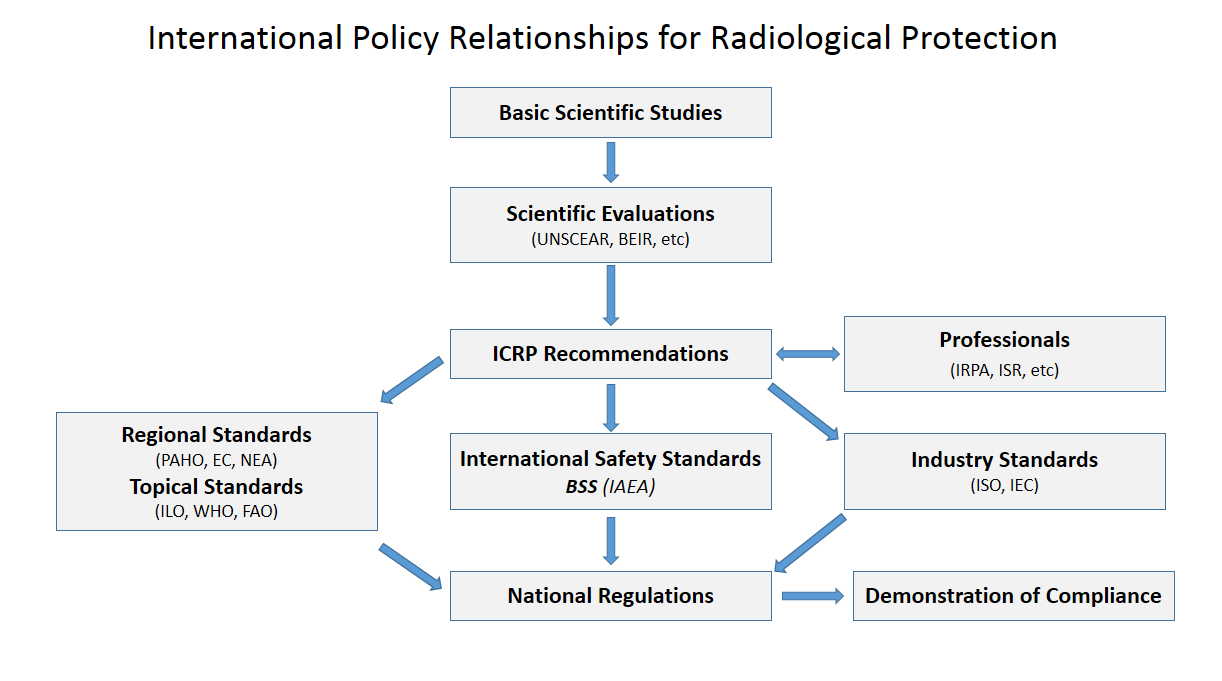
International policy relationships in radiological protection

== Structure ==
The General Assembly, made up of representatives from the Associate Societies, is the representative body of the Association. It delegates authority to the Executive Council for the efficient administration of the affairs of the Association.

Specific duties are carried out by IRPA Commissions, Committees, Task Groups and Working Groups:

- Commission on Publications
- Societies Admission and Development Committee
- International Congress Organising Committee
- International Congress Programme Committee
- Montreal Fund Committee
- Radiation Protection Strategy and Practice Committee
- Regional Congresses Co-ordinating Committee
- Rules Committee
- Sievert Award Committee
- Task Group on Security of Radioactive Sources
- Task Group on Public Understanding of Radiation Risk
- Working Group on Radiation Protection Certification and Qualification

== Associate societies ==
The following is a list of the 53 Associate Societies (covering 68 countries):

| State | Member Organisation | Date of membership |
|---|---|---|
| Argentina | Sociedad Argentina de Radioprotección | 1966 |
| Australasian | Australasian Radiation Protection Society (Australia & New Zealand) | 1976 for Australia 1999 for Australasian |
| Austria | Österreichischer Verband für Strahlenschutz | 1966 |
| Belgium | Belgian Association for Radiological Protection | 1965 |
| Brazil | Sociedade Brasileira de Proteção Radiológica | 1989 |
| Bulgaria | Bulgarian Association of Radiobiology and Radiation Protection | 2007 |
| Cameroon | Cameroon Radiological Protection Society | 2013 |
| Canada | Canadian Radiation Protection Association | 1979 |
| Chile | Sociedad Chilena de Protección Radiológica | 2020 |
| China | Chinese Society of Radiation Protection | 1989 |
| Colombia | Asociación Colombiana de Protección Radiológica | 2008 |
| Croatia | Croatian Radiation Protection Association | 1992 |
| Cuba | Cuban Physics Society, Radiation Protection Section | 1997 |
| Cyprus | Cyprus Association of Medical Physics and BioMedical Engineering | 1992 |
| Czech Republic | Czech Society for Radiation Protection | 1968 |
| Eastern Africa | Eastern Africa Association for Radiation Protection (Burundi, Ethiopia, Kenya, Rwanda, Somalia, Tanzania, Uganda) | 2004 |
| Egypt | IRPA Egypt Radiation Protection | 1992 |
| France | Société Française de Radioprotection | 1965 |
| German-Swiss | German-Swiss Association for Radiation Protection (Germany & Switzerland) | 1965 |
| Ghana | Ghana Association for Radiation Protection | 2016 |
| Greece | Greek Radiation Protection Association | 1988 |
| Hungary | Health Physics Section of the Roland Eötvös Physical Society | 1966 |
| India | Indian Association for Radiation Protection | 1969 |
| Iran | Iranian Radiation Protection Society | 2011 |
| Ireland | Irish Radiation Research Society | 1984 |
| Israel | Israel Society for Radiation Protection | 1965 |
| Italy | Associazione Italiana di Radioprotezione | 1965 |
| Japan | Japan Health Physics Society | 1965 |
| Korea | Korean Association for Radiation Protection | 1976 |
| Lithuania | Lithuanian Radiation Protection Society | 2002 |
| Madagascar | Institut National des Sciences et Techniques Nucléaires | 1999 |
| Malaysia | Malaysian Radiation Protection Association | 2006 |
| Mexico | Sociedad Mexicana de Seguridad Radiológica | 1976 |
| Morocco | Association Marocaine de Radioprotection | 2004 |
| Netherlands | Nederlandse Vereniging voor Stralingshygiëne | 1965 |
| Nigeria | Nigeria Society for Radiation Protection | 2016 |
| Nordic | Nordic Society for Radiation Protection (Denmark, Finland, Iceland, Norway, Sweden) | 1965 |
| Peru | Sociedad Peruana de Radioproteccion | 1989 |
| Philippines | Philippine Association for Radiation Protection | 1966 |
| Poland | Polskie Towarzystwo Fizyki Medycznej | 1970 |
| Portugal | Sociedade Portuguesa De Protecção Contra Radiacoes | 1995 |
| Romania | Societatea Romana De Radioprotectie | 1992 |
| Russia | Sectiya Radiazionnoy Gigieny of Russia | 1972 |
| Serbia-Montenegro | Radiation Protection Society of Serbia and Montenegro (Serbia & Montenegro) | |
| Slovak Republic | Slovak Society of Nuclear Medicine and Radiation Hygiene | 1995 |
| Slovenia | Radiation Protection Association of Slovenia | 1992 |
| Southern Africa | Southern African Radiation Protection Association (South Africa, Namibia, Botswana) | 1969 |
| Spain | Sociedad Española de Protección Radiológica | 1982 |
| Tunisia | Tunisian Association of Protection against Ionizing and Non-Ionizing Radiation | 2015 |
| United Kingdom | Society for Radiological Protection | 1965 |
| Uruguay | Uruguayan Society of Radioprotection | 1999 |
| USA | Health Physics Society | 1965 |
| Venezuela | Sociedad Venezolana de Protección Radiológica | 2012 |

== List of International Congresses ==
The 2032 Congress (IRPA18) will be in Australia 2032.

The 2028 Congress (IRPA17) will be in Spain, May 2028.

=== Past Congresses ===
IRPA 16 Orlando, July 2024

IRPA 15 Seoul, January 2021

IRPA 14 Cape Town, May 2016

IRPA 13 Glasgow, May 2012

IRPA 12 Buenos Aires, October 2008

IRPA 11 Madrid, May 2004

IRPA 10 Hiroshima, May 2000

IRPA 9 Vienna, April 1996

IRPA 8 Montreal, May 1992

IRPA 7 Sydney, April 1988

IRPA 6 Berlin, May 1984

IRPA 5 Jerusalem, March 1980

IRPA 4 Paris, April 1977

IRPA 3 Washington, September 1973

IRPA 2 Brighton, May 1970

IRPA 1 Rome, September 1966

== International Cooperation ==
IRPA maintains relations with many other international organizations in the field of radiation protection, such as those listed here.

=== Inter-Governmental Organizations ===
IAEA- International Atomic Energy Agency
ILO- International Labour Organization
NEA- Nuclear Energy Agency
UNSCEAR- United Nations Scientific Committee on the Effects of Atomic Radiation
WHO- World Health Organization

=== Non-Governmental Organizations ===
ICNIRP- International Commission on Non-Ionizing Radiation Protection
ICRP- International Commission on Radiological Protection
ICRU- International Commission on Radiation Units and Measurements
ISO- International Organization for Standardization

=== Professional Organizations ===
IOMP - International Organization for Medical Physics
ISR - International Society of Radiology
ISRO - International Society for Radiation Oncology
WFNMB - World Federation of Nuclear Medicine and Biology

== Awards ==
=== Rolf M. Sievert Award ===
Commencing with the 1973 IRPA Congress, each International Congress has been opened by the Sievert Lecture which is presented by the winner of the Sievert Award. This award is in honour of Rolf M. Sievert, a pioneer in radiation physics and radiation protection.

The Sievert Award consists of a suitable scroll, certificate or parchment, containing the name of the recipient, the date it is presented, and an indication that the award honours the memory of Professor Rolf M. Sievert.

The recipients of the Sievert Award are listed below:

=== Rolf M. Sievert Award ===
Commencing with the 1973 IRPA Congress, each International Congress has been opened by the Sievert Lecture, which is presented by the winner of the Sievert Award. This award is in honour of Rolf M. Sievert, a pioneer in radiation physics and radiation protection.

The Sievert Award consists of a suitable scroll, certificate or parchment, containing the name of the recipient, the date it is presented, and an indication that the award honours the memory of Professor Rolf M. Sievert.

The recipients of the Sievert Award are listed below:

- 2024: María del Rosario Pérez (Argentina)
- 2021: Eliseo Vañó (Spain)
- 2016: John Boice (United States)
- 2012: Richard Osborne (Canada)
- 2008: Christian Streffer (Germany)
- 2004: Abel J. González (Argentina)
- 2000: Itsuzo Shigematsu (Japan)
- 1996: Daniel Beninson (Argentina)
- 1992: Giovanni Silini (Italy)
- 1988: Wolfgang Jacobi (Germany)
- 1984: Sir Edward Pochin (United Kingdom)
- 1980: Lauriston S. Taylor (United States)
- 1977: W. V. Mayneord (United Kingdom)
- 1973: Bo Lindell (Sweden)

== See also ==
- Radioactivity
- Ionizing radiation
- Radiation protection
- International Atomic Energy Agency (IAEA)
- International Commission on Radiological Protection (ICRP)
- United Nations Scientific Committee on the Effects of Atomic Radiation (UNSCEAR)
- International Commission on Non-Ionizing Radiation Protection (ICNIRP)
- Index of radiation articles
