= Helmut Diefenthal =

German-born American medical missionary (1924–2019)

- Born: Carl Helmut Diefenthal; March 20, 1924; Berlin, Germany
- Died: June 30, 2019 (aged 95); Minneapolis, Minnesota, US
- Years active: 1956-2014
- Known for: Medical missionary work in Moshi, Tanzania

Carl Helmut Diefenthal (March 20, 1924, Berlin, Germany – June 30, 2019, Minneapolis, US) was a German-born American medical missionary, professor, and radiologist who spent more than 25 years working in the Tanzanian town of Moshi. He and his wife founded the Kilimanjaro School of Radiology in the late 1980s.

== Early years and education ==
Diefenthal was born in March 1924 in Berlin, Germany to a Jewish father. During Hitler's rise to power, the family's insurance firm was shuttered and his father was jailed twice, only escaping being sent to a concentration camp because of his marriage to a Lutheran woman. Diefenthal faced significant troubles in earning his medical degree due to his ancestry. He was eventually conscripted into the German Army during World War II as a medic. Though initially sent to Stalingrad, the Battle of Stalingrad saw him diverted to Crimea and Kyiv instead. Following the war, he was able to attend medical school at the Free University of Berlin and attended Martin Niemöller's St. Anne's Church in Dahlem. He met Rotraut "Ro" Garstka at Church and the two married in 1952. He completed his Internal Medicine residency at Wenckebach Hospital in Berlin in 1955. Diefenthal committed his life to missionary work after promising God he would "live a life of service" if he survived the war.

== Career ==
In 1956, Diefenthal and his wife began working with an American Lutheran missionary organization and were sent to a village near Ipoh, Malaysia, where they lived for four years and focused on clinical work in tuberculosis and parasite infestation. They were then sent to a remote village in Tanzania's Pare Mountains, where Diefenthal was the only doctor. After hearing of a new hospital being built in Moshi, he attended the University of Minnesota and finished his radiology degree in 1965. His wife became a radiographer during this time. In 1971, Kilimanjaro Christian Medical Center (KCMC) opened.

They returned to the United States in 1972, where Diefenthal worked at the VA Medical Hospital at Fort Snelling and as an assistant professor at the University of Minnesota. He enrolled in a series of courses to learn how to care for radiology equipment as well. By the late 1980s, Diefenthal and his wife were no longer eligible as missionaries due to their age. Instead, they used their pension and Social Security money to return to Tanzania in 1988. There, they founded the Kilimanjaro School of Radiology, where non-MD medical professionals could become certified medical assistants in radiology. In addition to teaching courses at Tumaini University, Diefenthal also started the university's radiology department and established two-year and four-year radiology residency programs.

In 1989, the Diefenthals started the East Africa Medical Assistance Fund to benefit KCMC. They returned to Minneapolis in 2014 where he continued to fundraise and develop training material for KCMC School of Radiology.

Diefenthal was given an American College of Radiology (ACR) honorary fellowship in 2003. In 2009, he and Ro were given a Hawkinson Honorary Award from the Vincent L. Hawkinson Foundation for Peace & Justice. In 2015, he was given the inaugural Global Humanitarian Award from the ACR and the following year, the International Society of Radiology awarded him a Béclére Medal.

== Personal life ==
The Diefenthals had four kids, two of which were born in Malaysia. KCMC opened the Helmut and Rotraut Diefenthal Cancer Care Centre in 2016. Diefenthal died on 30 June 2019 and Ro died in 2020.
