= International Commission on Radiological Education =

The International Commission for Radiological Education (ICRE) was the third of the three commissions established in 1928 at the second International Congress of Radiology. It operates under the auspices of the International Congress of Radiology and is funded by the International Society for Radiology. The commission's mandate is to coordinate the activities of radiologists in the field of education and to investigate educational standards and facilities in all countries in respect of radiological subjects.

Its early records appear to have been lost during the Second World War.
