= RCE1 =

Protein-coding gene in the species Homo sapiens

Identifiers
- Aliases: RCE1, FACE2, RCE1A, RCE1B, Ras converting CAAX endopeptidase 1
- External IDs: OMIM: 605385; MGI: 1336895; GeneCards: RCE1
Enzyme activity
EC #	BRENDA	ExPASy	KEGG	MetaCyc
3.4.26.1	↗	↗	↗	↗

Gene location (Human)
Chr.	Chromosome 11 (human)
Band	11q13.2	Start	66,842,835 bp
Band	11q13.2	End	66,846,552 bp

Gene location (Mouse)
Chr.	Chromosome 19 (mouse)
Band	19|19 A	Start	4,622,591 bp
Band	19|19 A	End	4,625,641 bp
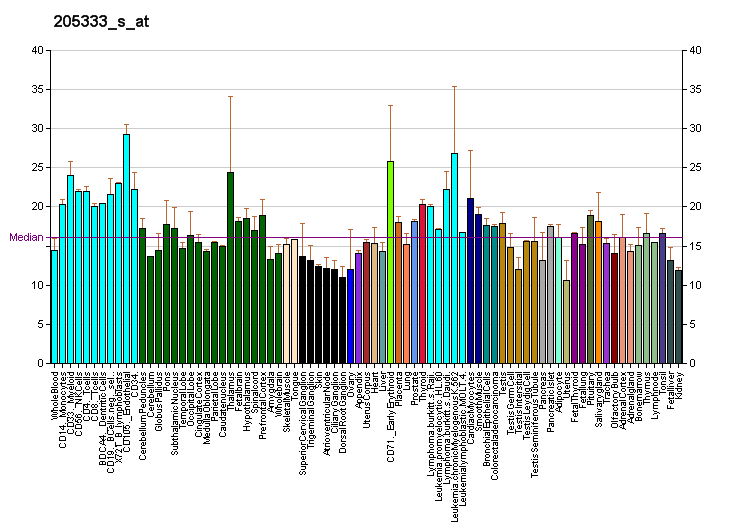
RNA expression pattern
Bgee	Human / Mouse (ortholog); Top expressed in: mucosa of transverse colon; right hemisphere of cerebellum; granulocyte; right testis; left testis; skin of abdomen; parotid gland; gonad; anterior pituitary; skin of leg / Top expressed in: white adipose tissue; proximal tubule; right kidney; bone marrow; yolk sac; adrenal gland; placenta; lip; islet of Langerhans; mesencephalon; More reference expression data
BioGPS	More reference expression data
Gene ontology
Molecular function	peptidase activity; cysteine-type endopeptidase activity; endopeptidase activity; metalloendopeptidase activity; hydrolase activity
Cellular component	integral component of membrane; integral component of endoplasmic reticulum membrane; integral component of plasma membrane; endoplasmic reticulum membrane; membrane; endoplasmic reticulum; cytosol
Biological process	proteolysis; CAAX-box protein processing; protein deubiquitination
Sources:Amigo / QuickGO
Orthologs
Databases	NCBI: entry; OMA: entry
Species	Human	Mouse
Entrez	9986	19671
Ensembl	ENSG00000173653	ENSMUSG00000024889
UniProt	Q9Y256	P57791
RefSeq (mRNA)	NM_005133; NM_001032279	NM_023131
RefSeq (protein)	NP_001027450; NP_005124	NP_075620; NP_001355641; NP_001355642; NP_001355643; NP_001355644
Location (UCSC)	Chr 11: 66.84 – 66.85 Mb	Chr 19: 4.62 – 4.63 Mb
PubMed search
- Wikidata
View/Edit Human	View/Edit Mouse

CAAX prenyl protease 2 is an enzyme that in humans is encoded by the RCE1 gene.

This gene encodes an integral membrane protein which is classified as a member of the metalloproteinase family. This enzyme is thought to function in the maintenance and processing of CAAX-type prenylated proteins.
