= Centre for Radiation, Chemical and Environmental Hazards =

British environmental research site

The Centre for Radiation, Chemical and Environmental Hazards (CRCE) is a British government environmental research site, run by Public Health England (PHE) in Chilton, Oxfordshire that monitors levels of toxic chemicals and background radiation in the British environment; it is largely a continuation of the former National Radiological Protection Board (NRPB).

== History ==
The Radiation Protection Division of the Health Protection Agency was formed on 1 April 2005, due to the Health Protection Agency Act 2004, directly superseding the NRPB. This became the CRCE due to the Health and Social Care Act 2012, when Public Health England was formed.

== Structure ==
It is part of PHE's Radiation Protection Adviser Services. PHE was the UK's first Radiation Protection Adviser Body, under the Ionising Radiations Regulations (IRR) 17 (which came from the International Commission on Radiological Protection).

== Function ==
It monitors background radiation in the UK. Workers exposed to radiation include workers in dental radiography and nuclear power stations; exposure to radiation for workers in the UK must be ALARP. It offers 3-day training courses around twice a month, at a national level, for workers exposed to radiation.

It produces reports on environmental background radiation in England. It works with the ICRP, the United Nations Scientific Committee on the Effects of Atomic Radiation (UNSCEAR), and the International Atomic Energy Agency (IAEA). Inside the UK, it works with the Scottish Environment Protection Agency (SEPA) and the Environment Agency (EA).

== See also ==
- British Institute of Radiology
- Health effects of radon
- International Radon Project
- NHS Health Research Authority
- UK Health Security Agency
