= Journal of Radiological Protection =

- Discipline: Radiobiology
- Language: English
- Edited by: Mike Thorne

Publication details
- Former name(s): Journal of the Society for Radiological Protection
- History: 1981–present
- Publisher: IOP Publishing on behalf of the Society for Radiological Protection (United Kingdom)
- Frequency: Quarterly
- Open access: Hybrid
- License: CC BY 3.0 (open access part)
- Impact factor: 1.8 (2024)

Standard abbreviations
- ISO 4: J. Radiol. Prot.

Indexing
- CODEN: JRPREA
- ISSN: 0952-4746 (print); 1361-6498 (web)

Links
- Journal homepage

Journal of Radiological Protection is a quarterly peer-reviewed scientific journal covering radiobiological research on all aspects of radiological protection, including non-ionizing as well as ionizing radiations. It is the official journal of the Society for Radiological Protection and published on their behalf by IOP Publishing. It was established in 1981 as the Journal of the Society for Radiological Protection, before obtaining its current name in 1988. The editor-in-chief is Mike Thorne.

== Abstracting and indexing ==
The journal is abstracted and indexed in:

- Inspec
- BIOSIS Previews
- Biological Abstracts
- Cambridge Scientific Abstracts
- Health and Safety Science Abstracts
- Risk Abstracts
- Ei Compendex
- EMBASE/Excerpta Medica
- Chemical Abstracts Service
- Index Medicus/MEDLINE
- VINITI Database RAS

According to the Journal Citation Reports, the journal has a 2023 impact factor of 1.4.

== See also ==
- Centre for Radiation, Chemical and Environmental Hazards (CRCE) in Oxfordshire
