= Edward Pochin =

British physician (1909–1990)

Sir Edward Eric Pochin CBE FRCP (22 September 1909 – 29 January 1990) was a British physician. He was a specialist in the dangers of ionizing radiation. From 1946 to 1974, he directed the Medical Research Council's department of clinical research.

== Biography ==
Born 22 September 1909, Pochin attended St John's College, Oxford, and qualified in medicine at University College Hospital (UCL), London, in 1935.

He directed the Medical Research Council's department of clinical research from 1946 to 1974. At UCL he worked with Keith Halnan.

Pochin served as advisor to the leading counsel for the British Government and expert witness at the Royal Commission into British nuclear tests in Australia in 1984–1987.

He married Constance Margaret Julia Tilly in 1940. They had two children. His wife died in 1971. He died on 29 January 1990, aged 80.

== Awards and recognition ==
He was appointed a CBE in 1959, and appointed Knight Bachelor in 1975. In 1982, he was awarded Gold Medal for Radiation Protection.

== Selected publications ==
- HALNAN KE; POCHIN EE (March 1958). "Radioiodine and thyroid hormone in the treatment of thyroid carcinoma". Metabolism: Clinical and Experimental. 7 (2): 184. ISSN 0026-0495. PMID 13516471. (Co-author)
- Edward Pochin, 1983, Nuclear Radiation: Risks and Benefits, Clarendon Press, Oxford

== See also ==
- Robin Auld
- McClelland Royal Commission
