= International Congress of Radiology =

The ICR discusses all forms of ionising radiation

The International Congress of Radiology (ICR) is a meeting of radiologists for the exchange of ideas and the harmonisation of international standards and practice, first held in 1925 in London and held at regular intervals since then. Since 1994 it has become a biennial event. Until 1953 each congress was organised by radiological society of the host country, but in that year, a formal organisation, the International Society for Radiology was set up to provide continuity between the congresses.

== History ==
At the second congress, held in 1928 in Stockholm, three international commissions were set up - the International Commission on Radiological Protection (ICRP), the International Commission on Radiation Units and Measurements (ICRU) and the International Commission on Radiological Education (ICRE). The former two have become fully functional organisations in their own right while the latter has remained a sub-committee of the ICR.

Within years of Röntgen discovering X-Rays in 1895, they were being used for imaging fractured bones. Various societies sprung up in different countries where ideas were exchanged between like-minded people and national standards for the measurement of X-Ray intensity developed. These societies also tried to address the problems associated with the dangers of X-Rays, particularly cancer.

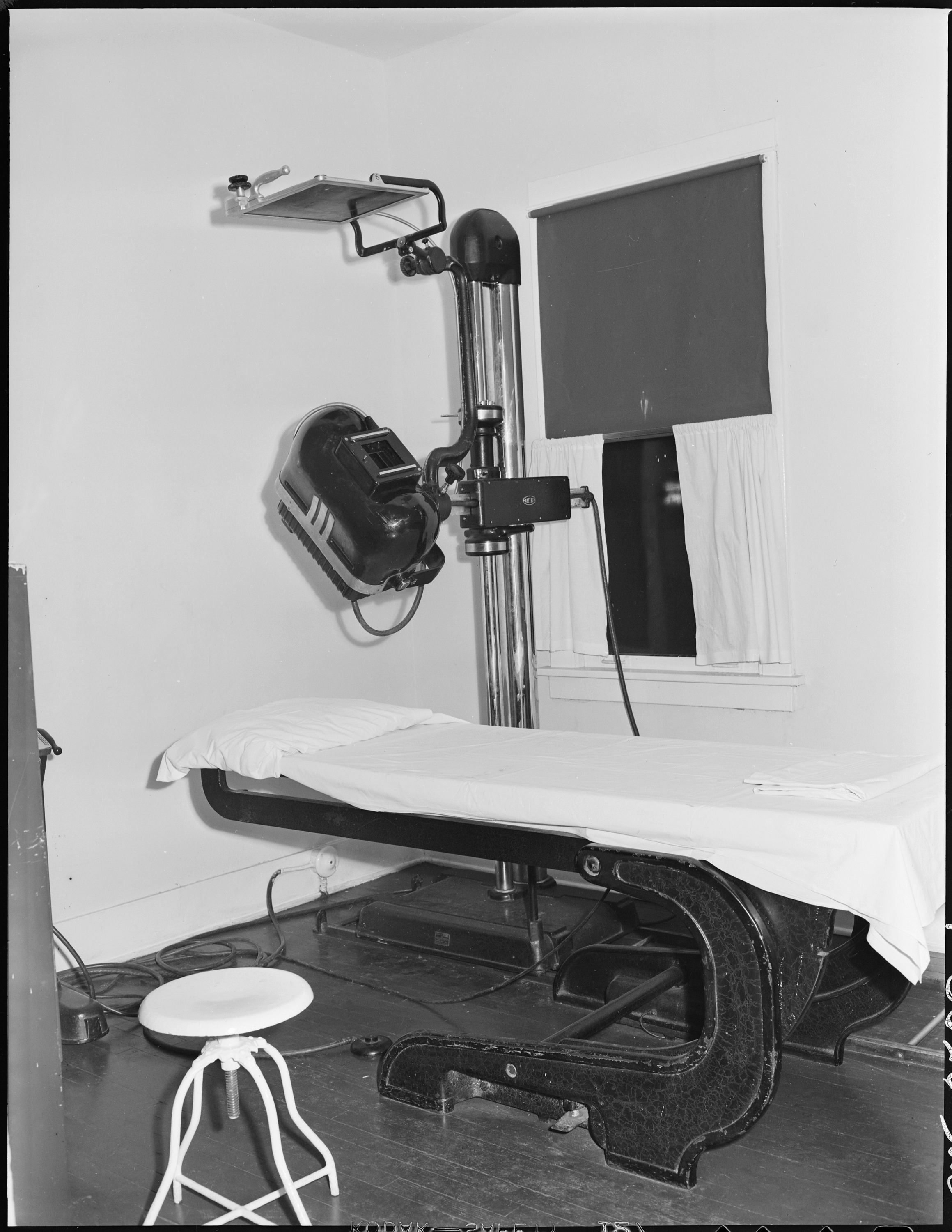
Typical X-ray equipment in the 1940s

By the end of the First World War a number of proposals on how to measure the intensity of X-Rays had been made, but there was little agreement between the various parties concerned. In 1925 the British Institute of Radiology, under the leadership of Charles Thurstan Holland invited delegates from a number of countries to attend the First International Congress on Radiation in London. This congress set up a framework for future meetings - future congresses would meet every three years in a different country, would be organised by the host country. The host country would nominate the chairman of the congress. It was also established that three commissions should be set up which would meet at the congresses:

- The International Commission of Radiation Units & Measures (ICRU)
- The International Commission on Radiological Protection (ICRP)
- The International Commission on Radiological Education (ICRE)

Until the outbreak of the Second World War, congresses were held every three years. The 1940 congress was due to meet in Berlin in 1940, but was suspended due to the war. Apart from some copies of records kept by the 1973 Congress secretary-general, Benjamin Orndoff, the records of the congress, which had been handed to the German organisers in preparation for the next congress in Germany, were lost during the Second World War.

The second congress was held in Stockholm under the chairmanship of Manne Siegbahn where the three commissions proposed in London met for the first time. Subsequent meetings were held in Paris (1931), Zurich (1934) and Chicago (1937).

After the war, the British Institute of Radiology organised the sixth Congress which was held in London, exactly 25 years after the first congress and in the same hall as the first congress. A total of 3364 people from 54 countries including 1,742 radiologists registered for the congress. The incumbent chairman of the ICR, Arthur C. Christie, who had been nominated thirteen years before was unable to attend the London conference, so Orndoff, the secretary-general of that congress deputised handing the presidency to Ralston Paterson. The congress also saw a resumption of the work of the three international commissions.

At the seventh congress, held in Copenhagen in 1953, the organisational details of the conference were overhauled and an executive committee under the chairmanship of Lauriston S. Taylor was set up to oversee the organisation of future congresses and to provide continuity between congresses.

Before the Second World War, the location of the congresses was dictated largely by the places of residence of the delegates who had to travel by rail or sea - a delegate from the western seaboard of the United States would have to commit a month to attend a week-long ICR congress in Europe. The advent of air travel removed this restriction and subsequent congresses have since been held in many parts of the world. The following congresses have been held to date (or are scheduled):

- 1925 (1st) - London
- 1928 (2nd) - Stockholm
- 1931 (3rd) - Paris
- 1934 (4th) - Zurich
- 1937 (5th) - Chicago
- 1950 (6th) - London
- 1953 (7th) - Copenhagen
- 1956 (8th) - Mexico City
- 1959 (9th) - Munich
- 1962 (10th) - Montreal
- 1965 (11th) - Rome
- 1969 (12th) - Tokyo
- 1973 (13th) - Madrid
- 1977 (14th) - Rio de Janeiro
- 1981 (15th) - Brussels
- 1985 (16th) - Hawaii
- 1989 (17th) - Paris
- 1994 (18th) - Singapore
- 1996 (19th) - Beijing
- 1998 (20th) - New Delhi
- 2000 (21st) - Buenos Aires
- 2002 (22nd) - Cancún, Mexico
- 2004 (23rd) - Montreal
- 2006 (24th) - Cape Town
- 2008 (25th) - Marrakesh
- 2010 (26th) - Shanghai
- 2012 (27th) - São Paulo
- 2014 (28th) - Dubai
- 2016 (29th) - Buenos Aires

== International Society of Radiology ==
The International Society of Radiology was set up in 1953 to oversee the organisation of the International Congresses of Radiology and to provide continuity between congresses.

The 1950 congress provided an occasion for workers in the radiology industry to meet for the first time in over a decade and to discuss the direction future congresses should take. At the 1953 congress, under the guidance of Flemming Norgaard in Copenhagen the International Society of Radiology was set up to oversee the organisation of the International Congresses of Radiology rather than the ad hoc arrangement whereby the organisation of the next congress was left entirely in the hands of the host country. A permanent committee would also provide continuity between congresses. Norgard became the first secretary-general of the Society, while the radiologist from the sponsoring society who had been president of a congress was, by that token, president of the ISR until the next meeting.

== See also ==
- Journal of Radiological Protection
- National Council on Radiation Protection and Measurements of the United States
