= United Nations Scientific Committee on the Effects of Atomic Radiation =

Organization of the United Nations

- Abbreviation: UNSCEAR
- Formation: 1955; 71 years ago
- Type: Scientific Committee
- Legal status: Active
- Headquarters: Vienna, Austria
- Chair: Sarah Baatout (Belgium)
- Parent organization: United Nations
- Website: unscear.org

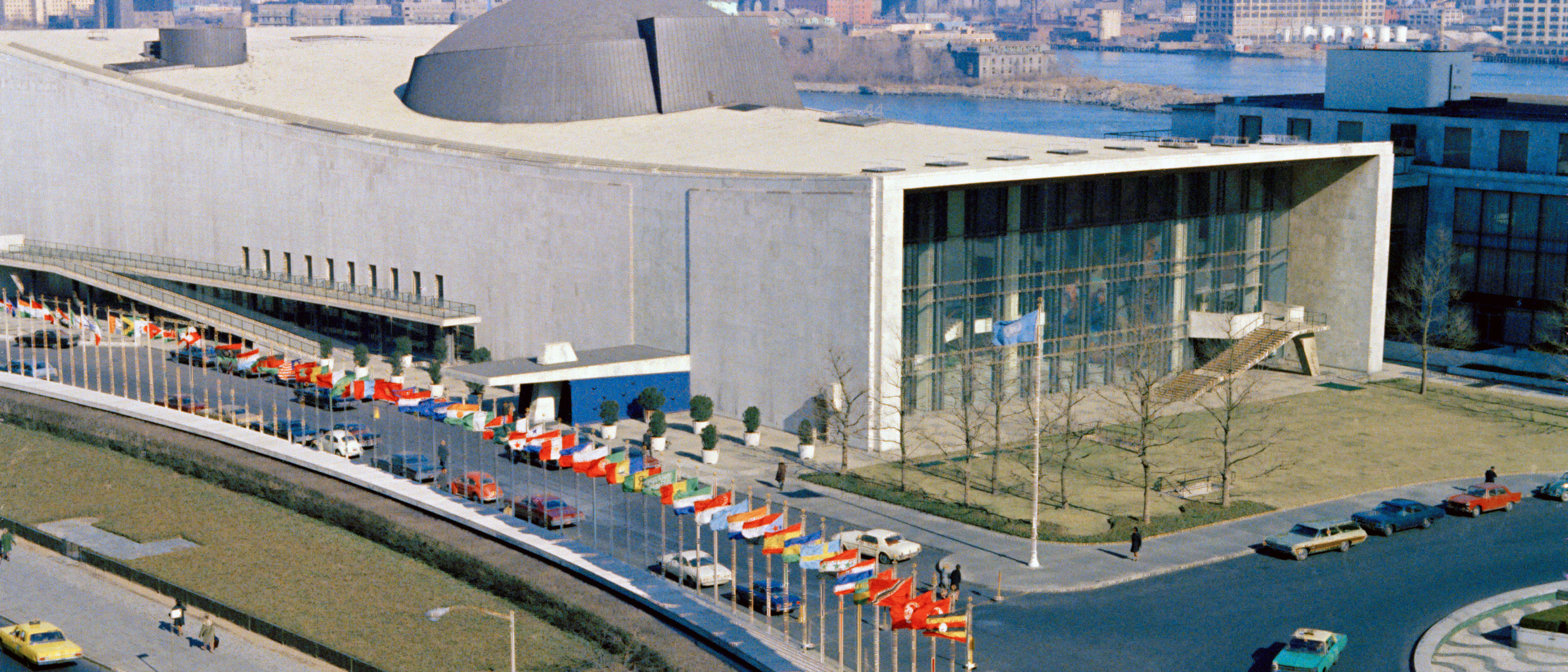

The United Nations Scientific Committee on the Effects of Atomic Radiation (UNSCEAR) was set up by resolution of the United Nations General Assembly in 1955. The United Nations General Assembly has designated 31 United Nations Member States as members of the Scientific Committee. The organization has no power to set radiation standards nor to make recommendations in regard to nuclear testing. It was established solely to "define precisely the present exposure of the population of the world to ionizing radiation". A small secretariat, located in Vienna and functionally linked to the United Nations Environment Programme (UNEP), organizes the annual sessions and manages the preparation of documents for the committee's scrutiny.

== Administration ==
Originally, in 1955, India and the Soviet Union wanted to add several neutral and communist states, such as mainland China. Eventually, a compromise with the US was made and Argentina, Belgium, Egypt and Mexico were permitted to join. The organisation was charged with collecting all available data on the effects of "ionising radiation upon man and his environment". (James J. Wadsworth - American representative to the General Assembly).

The committee was originally based in the Secretariat Building in New York City but moved to the United Nations Office at Vienna in 1974.

The Secretaries of the Committee were:

- Dr. Ray K. Appleyard (UK) (1956–1961)
- Dr. Francesco Sella (Italy) (1961–1974)
- Dr. Dan Jacobo Beninson (Argentina) (1974–1979)
- Dr. Giovanni Silini (Italy) (1980–1988)
- Dr. Burton Bennett (1988 acting; 1991–2000)
- Dr. Norman Gentner (2001–2004; 2005 acting)
- Dr. Malcolm Crick (2005–2018)
- Dr. Ferid Shannoun (2018–2019 acting)
- Ms. Borislava Batandjieva-Metcalf (Bulgaria) (2019–2024)
- Mr. Tiberio Cabianca (2024– acting)

== Contents of UNSCEAR 2020/2021 report ==
UNSCEAR has published in 2022 its last full report, the UNSCEAR 2020/2021 Report Vol. I, Vol. II, Vol. III and Vol. IV with scientific annexes (A to D).

- UNSCEAR 2020/2021 Report Volume I - The UNSCEAR 2020/2021 Report Volume I comprises the main text of the 2021 report to the General Assembly (A/76/46) and scientific annex A: Evaluation of medical exposure to ionizing radiation.
- UNSCEAR 2020/2021 Report Volume II - The UNSCEAR 2020/2021 Report Volume II comprises scientific annex B: Levels and effects of radiation exposure due to the accident at the Fukushima Daiichi Nuclear Power Station: implications of information published since the UNSCEAR 2013 Report.
- UNSCEAR 2020/2021 Report Volume III - The UNSCEAR 2020/2021 Report Volume III scientific annex C: Biological mechanisms relevant for the inference of cancer risks from low-dose and low-dose-rate radiation.
- UNSCEAR 2020/2021 Report Volume IV - The UNSCEAR 2020/2021 Report Volume IV comprises scientific annex D: Evaluation of occupational exposure to ionizing radiation.

== Contents of UNSCEAR 2013 report ==
- UNSCEAR 2013 Report Volume I - The UNSCEAR 2013 Report Volume I comprises the main text of the 2013 Report to the General Assembly (A/68/46) and scientific annex A: Levels and effects of radiation exposure due to the nuclear accident after the 2011 great east-Japan earthquake and tsunami.
  - Report to the General Assembly with Scientific Annexes
  - Annex A - Levels and effects of radiation exposure due to the nuclear accident after the 2011 great east-Japan earthquake and tsunami
- UNSCEAR 2013 Report Volume II - The UNSCEAR 2013 Report Volume II comprises scientific annex B: Effects of radiation exposure of children.
  - Report to the General Assembly with Scientific Annexes
  - Annex B - Effects of radiation exposure of children

== Contents of UNSCEAR 2008 report ==
"UNSCEAR 2008 REPORT Vol.I": Main report and 2 scientific annexes

- Report to the General Assembly with Scientific Annexes - This is the first of two volumes of scientific annexes that provide the supporting scientific assessment for UNSCEAR’s 2008 report to the General Assembly. This volume includes the Report to the General Assembly.
- Scientific Annex

- Annex A - Medical radiation exposures
- Annex B - Exposures of the public and workers from various sources of radiation

"UNSCEAR 2008 REPORT Vol.II" : 3 scientific annexes

- Report to the General Assembly with Scientific Annexes - This is the second of two volumes of scientific annexes C, D and E that provide the supporting scientific assessment on effects of ionizing radiation for UNSCEAR’s 2008 report to the General Assembly.
- Scientific Annex

- Annex C - Radiation exposures in accidents
- Annex D - Health effects due to radiation from the Chernobyl accident
- Annex E - Effects of ionizing radiation on non-human biota

== Type of radiation exposure ==
The United Nations Scientific Committee on the Effects of Atomic Radiation (UNSCEAR) itemized type of exposures and reported exposure rate of each segment.

Type of radiation exposures
Public exposure
| Natural Sources | Normal occurrences | Cosmic radiation |
| Natural Sources | Normal occurrences | Terrestrial radiation |
| Natural Sources | Enhanced sources | Metal mining and smelting |
| Natural Sources | Enhanced sources | Phosphate industry |
| Natural Sources | Enhanced sources | Coal mining and power production from coal |
| Natural Sources | Enhanced sources | Oil and gas drilling |
| Natural Sources | Enhanced sources | Rare earth and titanium dioxide industries |
| Natural Sources | Enhanced sources | Zirconium and ceramics industries |
| Natural Sources | Enhanced sources | Application of radium and thorium |
| Natural Sources | Enhanced sources | Other exposure situations |
| Man-made sources | Peaceful purposes | Nuclear power production |
| Man-made sources | Peaceful purposes | Transport of nuclear and radioactive material |
| Man-made sources | Peaceful purposes | Application other than nuclear power |
| Man-made sources | Military purposes | Nuclear tests |
| Man-made sources | Military purposes | Residues in the environment. Nuclear fallout |
Historical situations
Exposure from accidents
Occupational radiation exposure
| Natural Sources | | Cosmic ray exposures of aircrew and space crew |
| Natural Sources | | Exposures in extractive and processing industries |
| Natural Sources | | Gas and oil extraction industries |
| Natural Sources | | Radon exposure in workplaces other than mines |
| Man-made sources | Peaceful purposes | Nuclear power industries |
| Man-made sources | Peaceful purposes | Medical uses of radiation |
| Man-made sources | Peaceful purposes | Industrial uses of radiation |
| Man-made sources | Peaceful purposes | Miscellaneous uses |
| Man-made sources | Military purposes | Other exposed workers |
Source UNSCEAR 2008 Annex B retrieved 2011-7-4

== See also ==
- European Committee on Radiation Risk
- International Commission on Radiological Protection
- Radiation protection
