= Francis J. Bradley =

American health physicist (1926–2021)

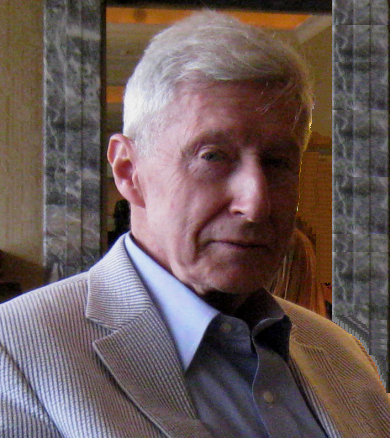
Francis J. Bradley, American health physicist, writer and founding member of the Health Physics Society

Francis J. Bradley (January 15, 1926 – May 29, 2021) was an American health physicist, writer and founding member of the Health Physics Society.

== Life and times ==
Francis J. "Frank" Bradley was born on January 15, 1926, in New York City, Queens County, New York. Bradley's father was a New York City fireman. The Bradley family lived in Corona, Queens New York. Bradley worked his way up to the rank of sergeant in the U.S. Army Air Force pulling duty as a gunner aboard a B-29 bomber and served in the Pacific Theater of Operations during World War II. Bradley graduated in 1949 from Manhattan College with a degree in electrical engineering.

== AEC Fellowship ==
In June 1949 Bradley applied for the Atomic Energy Commission (AEC) Fellowship in Radiological Physics and passed the examination administered at Columbia University. While taking the exam he met Herman Cember. Bradley and Cember passed the test but were delayed in starting the Fellowship as they waited for their Q clearance to be completed.

== Oak Ridge and Elda E. Anderson ==
Bradley began his career in health physics and radiological protection when he received an Atomic Energy Commission Fellowship grant in Radiological Physics at Oak Ridge National Laboratory. At Oak Ridge he started in the second class of Elda E. Anderson with students that included: Herman Cember, Allen Brodsky and Lester Rogers.

== Ohio State University ==
Francis J. Bradley went on to the Ohio State University responsible for Radiation Inspection as the Superintendent of Radiation Safety effective May 25, 1953, with an annual salary of $6,324.00. While at Ohio State, Bradley became a Fallout Shelter Analysis Instructor at the University of Pennsylvania.

== New York State ==
In 1977 Bradley held the position of Principal Radiophysicist, Division of Safety & Health, New York State Department of Labor. Bradley spent 20 years with the New York State Department of Labor, Radiological Health Unit as the Principal Radiophysicist. Bradley was the ANSI N43 Representative for the American Public Health Association in 1985.

== Health Physics Society ==
In 1955 while Superintendent of Radiation Safety at Ohio State University Bradley organized the initial conference of health physicists and from this meeting the Health Physics Society was formed with Karl Z. Morgan as president, Frederick P. Cowan as vice president, and Elda E. Anderson as Secretary/Treasurer. In the midyear issue of Science the announcement came of the formation of a new national scientific organization for health physicists at the 3 day Health Physics Conference at Ohio State University in Columbus, Ohio on June 14, 1955.

- Founding member and Director
- Charter member
- Life member
- Founders Award, 1988
- President, Government Section, 2000
- Failla Memorial Award, January 23, 2001

In the midyear issue of Science the announcement came of the formation of a new national scientific organization for health physicists at the 3 day Health Physics Conference at Ohio State University in Columbus, Ohio on June 14, 1955. The organization was temporarily named "Health Physics Society", and Karl Z. Morgan of the Health Physics Division of Oak Ridge National Laboratory was elected interim president. Other interim officers are:

- Frederick P. Cowan, Head, Health Physics Division Brookhaven National Laboratory, Upton, N.Y., vice president, and
- Elda E. Anderson, director of the education and training department of the Health Physics Division, Oak Ridge National Laboratory, secretary-treasurer.

=== First Board of Directors ===
Talks regarding the formation of a professional society had been ongoing for several years. The health physicists had decided to form an independent organization rather than attach to an existing group.
Directors of the Health Physics Society included:

- Herbert Mermagen, University of Rochester, Rochester, N.Y.
- Edgar Charles Barnes, manager of industrial hygiene, Westinghouse Atomic Power Division, Bettis Field, Pittsburgh, Pennsylvania
- John W. 'Jack' Healy, General Electric Co., Hanford, Washington
- William Taylor Ham, professor of biophysics, Medical College of Virginia, Richmond, Virginia
- C. Maurice Patterson, DuPont Atomic Energy Plant, Aiken, S.C.
- G. W. C. Tait, Health Physics Branch, Atomic Energy Co. of Canada, Ltd., Chalk River, Ontario, Canada
- Francis J. Bradley, superintendent of radiation safety at Ohio State University and organizer of the first Health Physics Society Conference
- William E. Nolan, Radiation Laboratory, University of California, Berkeley, California
- Walter Dunhan Claus, (annual salary $12,000), Division of Biology and Medicine, Biophysics Branch, U.S. Atomic Energy Commission, Washington, D.C.
- John E. Pickering, department of radiobiology, School of Aviation Medicine, Randolph Air Force Base, Texas

== International Atomic Energy Agency ==
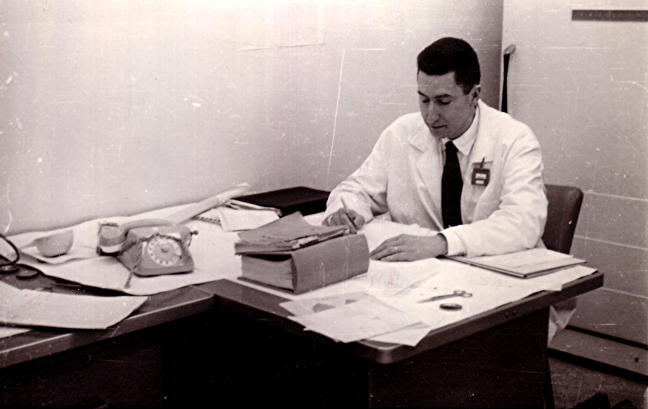
Turkey 1961. Bradley assisted with the establishment of a national radiation control program for the 1 MW nuclear reactor at Çekmece Nuclear Research and Training Center that went critical on May 27, 1962.

In 1961 Bradley worked for the International Atomic Energy Agency and went to Turkey and assisted with the establishment of a national radiation control program for the 1 MW nuclear reactor at Çekmece Nuclear Research and Training Center that went critical on May 27, 1962. Bradley next went to Taiwan to help develop the radiation safety program for the country's first reactor.

== Project Long Shot and Vela Project ==
Bradley was involved with Project Long Shot, the underground nuclear tests on Amchitka Island that is part of the Aleutian Islands. In 1965 as part of Vela Project he conducted radiological measurements and performed environmental sampling.
