= Lauriston S. Taylor =

American physicist (1902–2004)

Lauriston Sale Taylor
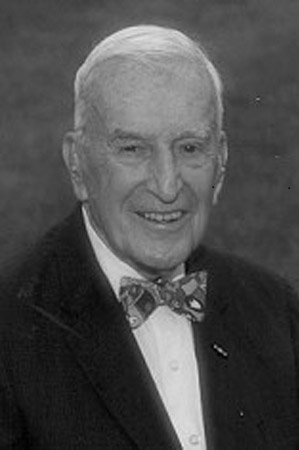
- Lauriston S. Taylor
- Born: 1 June 1902; Brooklyn, New York
- Died: 26 November 2004 (aged 102); The Collington Retirement Center in Mitchellville, Maryland
- Education: Stevens Institute; Cornell University
- Awards: Gold Medal for Radiation Protection (1973); Medal of Freedom; Bronze Star
- Scientific career
- Fields: Physicist, Radiation research scientist
- Workplaces: Bell Laboratories; Memorial Hospital (New York City, New York); National Bureau of Standards

Lauriston S. Taylor (1 June 1902 – 26 November 2004) was an American physicist known for his work in the field of radiation protection and measurement.

== Career ==
He established standards for X-ray radiation exposure for the first time in the 1920s, which eventually led to a group of government organizations that set the standards over the next 50 years. Taylor remained active in debates about radiation exposure into his 80s, often advocating the viewpoint that small doses of radiation were not important.

== Accolades ==
He served as president of the Health Physics Society (HPS) from 1958 to 1959. He was a recipient of the Medal of Freedom, and the Presidential Bronze Star (then the highest military award that could be given to a civilian).

== Vignettes of early radiation workers ==
In 1977 the Food and Drug Administration of the U.S. Department of Health and Human Services initiated a series of 25 recorded interviews with early radiation workers to provide an historical overview of their research and discoveries primarily in the fields of medical physics, radiation, and radiobiology. Lauriston S. Taylor moderated the series and also was an interview subject.

=== Interview subjects ===
- Howard Andrews
- Walter Binks, physicist and specialist in radiology
- Carl Bjorn Braestrup
- Austin M. Brues, physician National Research Council
- Robley Evans
- George Henny
- Paul Henshaw, physician National Research Council
- Norman Hilberry, "Mr. Scram", axe man at the first chain reaction for Chicago Pile 1, Director of Argonne National Laboratory, 1957-1961
- Lillian E. Jacobson, physicist, radiotherapy department and laboratory division of Montefiore Hospital, New York
- Harold E. Johns, Canadian medical physicist
- George Laurence, Canadian nuclear physicist
- John H. Lawrence, American physicist and physician, nuclear medicine pioneer
- Herbert M. Parker, English born, American pioneer in medical radiation therapy and radiation safety
- Sir Edward Eric Pochin, British physician, specialist in ionizing radiation safety
- Edith Quimby, American medical researcher and physicist, pioneer in nuclear medicine
- John E. Rose, health physicist
- Roberts Rugh, department of radiology, Columbia University, directed research on the effects of ionizing radiation, served as senior medical consultant
- Eric E. Smith, British specialist in the field of ionizing radiation
- James Newell Stannard, radiobiologist, pharmacologist and physiologist at the National Institutes of Health
- Lauriston Sale "Laurie" Taylor
- E. Dale Trout, radiologist, professor emeritus of radiological physics, Oregon State University
- John G. Trump, American high-voltage engineer and physicist
- John Austin "Jack" Victoreen, self-taught radio engineer, pioneer of radiation detection instruments
- Samuel Reid Warren Jr., professor in electrical engineering at the University of Pennsylvania and radiation physicist
- Shields Warren, pioneer pathologist and expert in medical radiation
- Marvin Martin Dixon Williams, pioneer in medical physics, head of physics at the Mayo Clinic
- Harold O. Wyckoff, pioneer in measurement of radiation and radiation protection standards
