= Atomic Energy Project =

Atomic Energy Project was started at the University of Rochester as a graduate teaching program. Also known as the University of Rochester Atomic Energy Project or URAEP.

== Atomic Energy Project genesis ==
The Atomic Energy Project was the continuation of the Manhattan Project after the end of World War II. The idea was to continue the work of training the people necessary for the peaceful use of atomic energy and nuclear materials.

== Key personnel ==
- Stafford L. Warren directed the Department of Radiology at Rochester and the Atomic Energy Project had three divisions.
- William Freer Bale headed the Radiology and Biophysics division that worked largely on radioactive materials — for example, Radium, Radon, Plutonium, and Polonium.
- James Newell Stannard was responsible for 2 sections, the Radiation Toxicology section and the Radioautography section.
- Harold Hodge headed the Pharmacology and Toxicology division that focused on Uranium including inhalation studies.
- Joe Wiseman Howland, M.D., Ph.D. headed the Medical Services division.
- Herbert Mermagen worked in the Medical Physics section as a radiological physicist, known today as a health physicist.

== Radiation Dose Reconstruction ==
The National Institute for Occupational Safety and Health (NIOSH) part of the Centers for Disease Control and Prevention started the Radiation Dose Reconstruction NIOSH program area for the University of Rochester Atomic Energy Project.

Employees of the U.S. Department of Energy, earlier agencies, and contractors and subcontractors that worked at the University of Rochester Atomic Energy Project in Rochester, New York, from 1 September 1943 - 30 October 1971, for at least 250 work days were included in the study. Additional employees included Laboratory Technicians that worked in the University of Rochester Atomic Energy Project laboratory building from 1 September 1943 to 19 June 1945.
