= Geneva Smith Douglas =

Nuclear physicist and radiation scientist

Geneva Smith Douglas (April 24, 1932 – January 30, 1993) was a nuclear physicist and radiation scientist who worked for both the U.S. Public Health Service and the U.S. Environmental Protection Agency. She served as a scientific collaborator for the nuclear industry and the communities local to her work in researching the impacts of nuclear weapon testing programs at the Nevada Test Site. She developed an offsite radiation monitoring program in her time as the Program Operations Manager of the Environmental Monitoring Systems Laboratory and focused much of her time to speaking and advising on nuclear safety and nuclear testing throughout her career and following her retirement. Douglas was an activist for Soroptimist International and was a charter member of Soroptimist International of Greater Las Vegas. Douglas, with her previous employment and her position within Soroptimist International, lobbied Congress on environmental issues, such as environmental preservation.

== Early life and education ==
Geneva Smith Douglas was born on April 24, 1932, in Gloucester, Massachusetts and she attended Rockport High School. She graduated with an undergraduate degree in biology from Colby College in 1954 and earned a master's degree in physiology from Mount Holyoke College in 1956. Her postgraduate studies at the University of Rochester were completed in physiology, radiation biology, and health physics.

== Career ==
During her postgraduate studies, Douglas worked the University of Rochester Atomic Energy Project as a research assistant studying nuclear fission products from 1956 to 1959. In 1959 she worked as a radiation biologist for the U.S. Public Health Service for the Southwestern Radiological Health Laboratory which moved her to Las Vegas, Nevada. She held a dual career for the Public Health Service monitoring radiation at the Nevada Test Site as a Public Affairs Director and for the U.S. Environmental Protection Agency as a Public Information Director, informing the local communities about radiation and nuclear testing. In the course of her time at the Southwestern Radiological Health Laboratory (later named the Environmental Monitoring Systems Laboratory), Douglas was a radiation monitoring advisor and conducted nuclear test emergency response assessments and evaluations, and eventually created an offsite radiation monitoring program. This program was developed while she worked as the Program Operations Manager of the Environmental Monitoring Systems Laboratory.

Douglas retired from the EPA in 1985, but continued to work as an independent consultant and EPA expert. She also acted as a nuclear technical advisor, speaking on simulated and actual nuclear disasters, speaking to Congress about nuclear testing, radiation exposure, and environmental preservation in 1985. During and following her career, Douglas was active in Soroptimist International, mainly as a charter member of the Soroptimist International of Greater Las Vegas. She served as president twice and also was active in the Sierra Nevada Region and acted as the Environmental Advisor for Soroptimist International of the Americas. In 1983, Douglas was designated a member of the Long Range Planning Group for Soroptimist International. Between 1987 and 1991, she was responsible for international service programs including Economic and Social Development, Education, Health, Human Rights/Status of Women, and Environment.

In 1986, Nevada Governor Richard Bryan chaired Douglas as the Governor's Advisory Committee on Volunteerism where Douglas was tasked to coordinate volunteer activity in Nevada. With this position, she organized the first Nevada Conference on Volunteerism. Between 1985 – 1987, Douglas served for the Friends of Nevada Wilderness, working with environmental groups to encourage the protection and preservation of Nevada wilderness. She continued lobbying Congress in her time with these groups, providing statements and testimony for wilderness preservation.

== Death and recognition ==
Geneva Smith Douglas died on January 30, 1993, in Las Vegas, Nevada, at the age of 60. In 1983, she was the EPA nomination for the Congressional Award for Exemplary Service to the public and in 1985, Douglas was the recipient of the Public Health Service Meritorious Service Medal. In Soroptimist International, Douglas held both the highest local and regional offices.
