= Edgar Barnes =

Edgar Barnes may refer to:

- H. Edgar Barnes (1883–1940), American jurist
- Edgar Charles Barnes (1909–1987), pioneer in the field of industrial hygiene
