= Elda Emma Anderson =

American physicist (1899–1961)

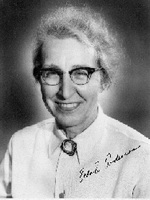
- Elda Emma Anderson, physicist and health researcher
- Born: October 5, 1899; Green Lake, Wisconsin, U.S
- Died: April 17, 1961 (aged 61); Oak Ridge, Tennessee, U.S
- Education: Ripon College; University of Wisconsin
- Scientific career
- Fields: Physicist
- Workplaces: Estherville Junior College; Milwaukee-Downer College; Los Alamos Laboratory; Oak Ridge National Laboratory
- Thesis: Low energy levels in the atomic spectra Co VII and Ni VIII (1941)

Elda Emma Anderson (October 5, 1899 – April 17, 1961) was an American physicist and health researcher. During World War II, she worked on the Manhattan Project at Princeton University and the Los Alamos National Laboratory, where she prepared the first sample of pure uranium-235 at the laboratory. A graduate of the University of Wisconsin, she became professor of physics at Milwaukee-Downer College in 1929. After the war, she became interested in health physics. She worked in the Health Physics Division of the Oak Ridge National Laboratory, and established the professional certification agency known as the American Board of Health Physics.

== Early life and education ==
Elda Emma Anderson was born in Green Lake, Wisconsin, on October 5, 1899, to Edwin A. Anderson (born in Wisconsin) and his wife, Lena (née Heller) (born in Germany). Anderson was one of three children. Although she was captivated by numbers at an early age, Anderson actually sought to become a kindergarten teacher. This would shift to an interest in science later, partially due to the influence of her older sister, who was an assistant chemistry instructor. As a whole, although her family had certain lofty expectations for their younger daughter, they all supported her in her academic endeavors.

Anderson earned a Bachelor of Arts (AB) degree from Ripon College in 1922, then a Master of Arts (AM) in physics from the University of Wisconsin in 1924. From 1924 to 1927, she taught at Estherville Junior College in Iowa, where she was the dean of physics, chemistry and mathematics. In 1928, she taught Chemistry and Physics at Menasha High School. In 1929, she became professor of physics at Milwaukee-Downer College (an elite women's college later absorbed into Lawrence University), then head of the physics department in 1934.

== Career and research ==
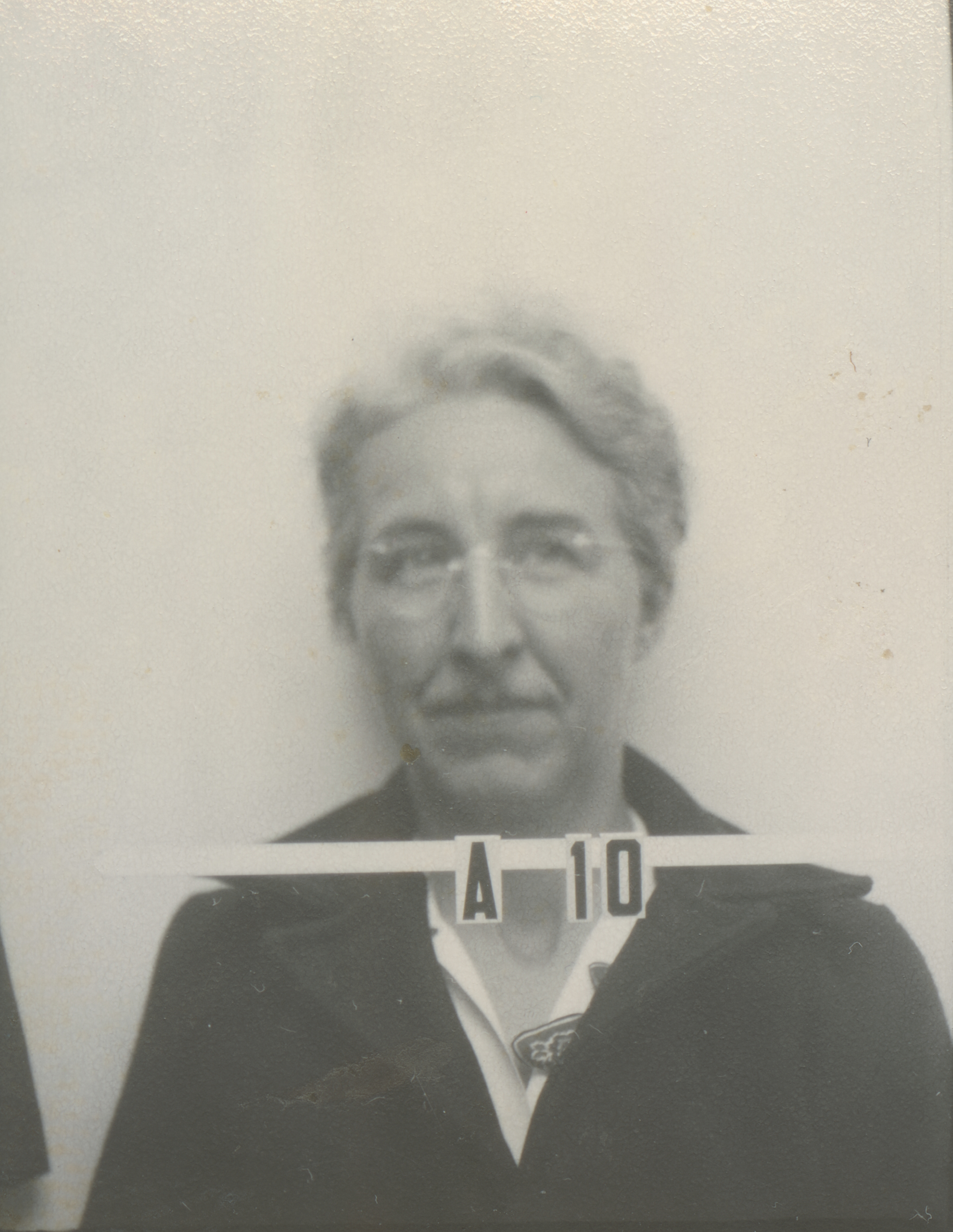
Elda E. Anderson's Los Alamos wartime security badge photo

In 1941 Anderson completed her PhD at the University of Wisconsin, writing her thesis on "Low energy levels in the atomic spectra Co VII and Ni VIII". Immediately after finishing her PhD, Anderson requested time off from her position at Milwaukee-Downer College, in order to conduct war research related to the Manhattan Project at the Office of Scientific Research and Development at Princeton University. Not long after, Anderson was recruited to continue her work specifically at Los Alamos Laboratory. At her new location, Anderson studied basic fission parameters, including analyzing the time delays associated with the absorption and emission of neutrons. Such work often entailed working upwards of sixteen hours a day. Among other accomplishments at Los Alamos, Anderson prepared the first sample of pure uranium-235 at the laboratory. While there, she lived in a dormitory, and being older than most of the other residents (she was aged fifty), she was put in charge. She often worked at night, wearing jeans and a plaid shirt – not the usual attire for a woman at the time.

Following the war, in 1947, Anderson left Los Alamos and returned to teaching at Milwaukee-Downer College, but her involvement in atomic physics led to an interest in the health effects of radiation. In 1949, she left teaching to begin a career in health physics. At the Health Physics Division of the Oak Ridge National Laboratory in Tennessee, which was only five years old when she joined, she became the first chief of education and training. She spent her career helping to establish the new training program in health physics, teaching and advising graduate fellows in health physics from 1949.

In 1949, Anderson moved to Oak Ridge, Tennessee to become the first chief of education and training in the Health Physics Division of the Oak Ridge National Laboratory. Anderson also worked with faculty members at Vanderbilt University in Nashville, Tennessee, to create a master's degree program in health physics at that institution. In addition, she was responsible for training military personnel, state and federal officers and university professors who are currently the leaders in health physics.

Outside of necessary obligations, Anderson was also known for helping students with problems both academic and personal, lending helpful guidance. In some cases, Anderson was known to have given loans to students, as well share a drink in troubling times.

Anderson organized the first international course in her field in Stockholm in 1955; she organized similar courses in Belgium in 1957 and Mumbai in 1958. She supported the establishment of the Health Physics Society in 1955, serving as secretary pro tem and then charter secretary, and eventually as president of the Society from 1959 to 1960. In 1960, she established the professional certification agency known as the American Board of Health Physics. Despite contracting leukemia in 1956, Anderson remained undeterred in her career and maintained her position for several years until her eventual death in 1961.

== Death and legacy ==
In 1956, Anderson, who never married and had no children, developed leukemia. She died nearly five years later in Oak Ridge, Tennessee, of breast cancer and leukemia, possibly as the result of her work with radioactive materials, on April 17, 1961. Anderson was buried at Green Lake Cemetery in Green Lake, Wisconsin. She was survived by her sister, Lucille McConnell and niece, Natalie Tarr Millemann. Dr. Anderson's obituary was well covered in the press and scientific journals. Tributes were written by colleagues and former students.

Anderson is honored each year at the annual meeting of the Health Physics Society when the Elda E. Anderson Award is presented to a young member of the Society.

== Select publications ==
- Ph.D. Dissertation: Anderson, Elda E. (1941). Low Energy Levels in the Atomic Spectra of Cobalt VII and Nickel VIII. University of Wisconsin—Madison.
- Mack, J. E., & Anderson, E. E. (1944). "A 21‐Foot Multiple Range Grazing Incidence Spectrograph". Review of Scientific Instruments. 15(2): 28–36.
- Anderson, E. E., Lavatelli, L. S., McDaniel, B. D., & Sutton, R. B. (1944). "Boron cross sections for neutrons from 0.01 to 1000 eV". Atomic Energy Commission.
- Anderson, E. E., Lavatelli, L. S., McDaniel, B. D., & Sutton, R. B. (1944). Measurements on the Cross-Section of 94 Pu-239 as a Function of Neutron Energy in the Range from 0.01 eV to 3.0 eV (No. LA-91). Los Alamos Scientific Laboratory. New Mexico.
- Anderson, E. E., McDaniel, B. D., Sutton, R. B., & Lavatelli, L. S. (1945). Absorption and Fission Cross Sections of 94 Pu-239 in the Neutron Energy Range 0.01 eV to 100 eV (No. LA-266). Los Alamos Scientific Laboratory. New Mexico.
- Sutton, R. B., McDaniel, B. D., Anderson, E. E., & Lavatelli, L. S. (1947). "The Capture Cross Section of Boron for Neutrons of Energies from 0.01 eV to 1000 eV". Physical Review. 71(4): 272.
- McDaniel, B. D., Sutton, R. B., Lavatelli, L. S., & Anderson, E. E. (1947). "The Absorption Cross Section of Gold for Neutrons of Energies from 0.01 to 0.3 eV". Physical Review. 72(8): 729.
- Sutton, R. B., T. Hall, E. E. Anderson, H. S. Bridge, J. W. DeWire, L. S. Lavatelli, E. A. Long, T. Snyder, and R. W. Williams. (1947). "Scattering of Slow Neutrons by Ortho- and Parahydrogen". Physical Review. 72(12): 1147.
- Sutton, R. B., T. Hall, E. E. Anderson, H. S. Bridge, J. W. DeWire, L. S. Lavatelli, E. A. Long, T. Snyder, and R. W. Williams. (1947). "Neutron diffraction studies of NaH and NaD". Physical Review. 72: 1147–56.
- Anderson, Elda E. (1950). Manual on Radiological Protection for Civilian Defense (No. M-4514). Oak Ridge National Laboratory.
- Anderson, E. E. (1952). "Units of radiation and radioactivity". Public Health Reports. 67(3): 293.
- Anderson, E. E. (1954). "Education and Training of Health Physicists". Radiology. 62(1): 83–87.
- Lukens, H. R. Jr., Anderson, E. E., & Beaufait, L. J. Jr. (1954). "Punched Card System for Radioisotopes". Analytical Chemistry. 26(4): 651–652.
- Kohl, J., Newacheck, R. L., & Anderson, E. E. (1955). "Gaseous and Liquid Tracers for Underground Studies". In Proceedings. University of California.
- Kohl, J., Newacheck, R. L., & Anderson, E. E. (1955). "Locating Casing Shoe Leaks with Radioactive Argon". Transactions of the American Institute of Mining and Metallurgical Engineers. 204(12): 213–216.
- Newacheck, R. L., Beaufait, L. J., & Anderson, E. E. (1957). "Isotope Milker Supplies ^{137}Ba from Parent ^{137}Cs". Nucleonics. 15(5): 122.
- Beaufait, L. J. Jr., Anderson, E. E., & Peterson, J. P. (1958). "Development and Preparation of Set of Gamma Spectrometer Standards". Analytical Chemistry. 30(11): 1762–1764.
- Anderson, Elda E. (1959). Assignment report on training course for health physicists. Bombay, India. November–December 1958.
- Zumwalt, L. R., & Anderson, Elda E. (1960). Xe-133 Release Data Obtained to Date on Various Sample Fuel Bodies (No. GA-P-32-257). General Atomic Division. General Dynamics Corp. San Diego, CA.
- Anderson, E. E., Gethard, P. E., & Zumwalt, L. R. (October 1961). "Use of the King Furnace in Fission-Product Retention Studies of Graphite Reactor Fuels". In Proceedings of the Second Conference on Nuclear Reactor Chemistry. Gatlinburg, Tennessee (pp. 171–192).
- Anderson, E. E., Gethard, P. E., & Zumwalt, L. R. (1962). "Steady-State Release Fraction of Krypton and Xenon Fission Products at High Temperatures from (U, Th) C_{2}-Graphite Fuel Matrix in Out-Of-Pile Experiments (No. GA-3211)". General Atomic Div. General Dynamics Corp. San Diego, CA.
- Zumwalt, L. R., Anderson, E. E., & Gethard, P. E. (1962). "Fission Product Retention Characteristics of Certain (Th, U) C_{2}-Graphite Fuels". Proceedings. ANS Topical Meeting on Materials and Fuels for High-Temperature Nuclear Energy Applications. 11–13.
- Anderson, E. E., Wessman, G. L., & Zumwalt, L. R. (1962). "Fission Product Trapping—Sorption of Cesium by Activated Charcoal". Nuclear Science and Engineering. 12(1): 106–110.
- Zumwalt, L. R., Gethard, P. E., & Anderson, E. E. (1963). "Fission-Product Release from 'Single-Crystal' UC_{2} Particles". Transactions of the American Nuclear Society. 6(1): 132.
- Anderson, E. E., Gardner, J. O., Gethard, P. E., Goeddel, W. V., Hooker, J. R., Lonsdale, H. K., ... & Zumwalt, L. R. (1963). Advanced, Graphite-Matrix, Dispersion-Type Fuel Systems. Annual Report. April 1, 1962 – March 31, 1963 (No. GA-4022;(Pt. 1)). General Atomic Division. General Dynamics Corp. San Diego, CA.
- Anderson, Elda E., & Zumwalt, L. R. (1964). "The Diffusion of Barium in Simulated High-Temperature Graphite Fuel Elements". Transactions of the American Nuclear Society(US). 7.
