= Frank Bradley =

Frank Bradley may refer to:

- Frank Bradley (baseball) (1918–2002), American Negro leagues baseball player
- Frank Henry Bradley (1853–1897), English organist.
- Frank Howe Bradley (1838–1879), American geologist
- Frank M. Bradley, United States Navy admiral
- Frank Bradley, who named Bechler River
- Frank Bradley, a character in The Adventures of Rex and Rinty

== See also ==
- Francis Bradley (disambiguation)
