= G. William Morgan =

Health physicist

G. William Morgan, also known as George William Morgan, health physicist and founding member of the Health Physics Society. Morgan held key health physics positions at Oak Ridge National Laboratory, the Manhattan Project and the Atomic Energy Commission. Morgan was instrumental in developing the regulations that we know today as I0 CFR 20, the Standards for Protection against Radiation.

== Awards and honors ==
- G. William Morgan Lectureship Award established in his honor under the terms of his will.

== Professional affiliations ==
- Charter member, Health Physics Society
- Charter member, National Council on Radiation Protection and Measurements, NCRP, 1964

== Publications ==
- Some practical considerations in radiation shielding.
- Gamma and Beta Radiation Shielding.
- Surveying and monitoring of radiation from radioisotopes.
- Decontamination and disposal of radioactive wastes.
- Considerations for the Return of Radioactive Isotopes to Commission Facilities for Disposal.
- Air contamination and respiratory protection in radioisotope work.
- Radiation Safety in Industrial Radiography with Radioisotopes.
- The Control of Radioisotopes.
- Facilities and equipment for isotopes program.
- Health Physics Insurance Seminar.
