= Rugh =

Rugh may refer to:

- Carrie Rugh (born 1961), American figure skater
- Roberts Rugh (1903–1978), American biologist
