= Robley D. Evans =

Robley D. Evans may refer to:

- Robley D. Evans (admiral), United States Navy admiral
- Robley D. Evans (physicist), American physicist

== See also ==
- Robley Dunglison, English-American physician, medical educator and author
