= American Academy of Health Physics =

- Founded: 1982
- Type: 501(c)(3) Non-Profit Organization
- Purpose: Health Physics Certification and Professional Networking
- Location: State of New Jersey
- Website: American Academy of Health Physics

The American Academy of Health Physics (AAHP)) is a non-profit organization based in East Windsor, NJ which serves to advance the profession of health physics through networking opportunities for members, certification of health physicists, and advisement to professionals to increase the application of health physics. The Academy has selective criteria for membership in the organization.

== Mission statement ==
The American Academy of Health Physics is a registered 501(c)(3) non-profit organization which seeks to advance the goals of the Health Physics profession, advises the highest moral integrity in the practice of Health Physics, and improves the connections between health physicists, providing an avenue for Certified Health Physicists to obtain certification in the profession. The mission of the AAHP is accomplished with a specific Strategic Plan.

== Membership ==
Those eligible for full membership for the American Academy of Health Physics are all individuals who have been granted certification in Comprehensive Health Physics by the American Board of Health Physics (ABHP). Those completing the first part of the two-part exam are eligible for associate membership. According to the AAHP Membership List (www.aahp-abhp.org) as of January 2025 the AAHP has 1,128 members

== Leadership ==
The Executive Committee for 2025 is:

- President - Jay Poston
- President Elect - Brant Ulsh
- Past President - Armin Ansari
- Treasurer - Ruth McBurney
- Secretary - Michael Ford
- Past Treasurer - Wayne Gaul
- Director - Cindy Flannery
- Director - Pat LaFrate
- Director - Latha Vasudevan
- ABHP Chair, Ex-Officio- David Medich

== Awards and recognition ==
The Academy confers several awards.

=== William McAdams Outstanding Service Award ===
The William McAdams Outstanding Service Award, is named after one of the founders of the Certification process for health physicists, William A. McAdams, It is given to those certified Health Physicists who have made a significant contribution toward the advancement of professionalism in Health Physics and to the Certification process. The award may be given posthumously. It has been awarded to:

- 1989 – John W. Healy
- 1990 – H. Wade Patterson
- 1991 – Richard R. Bowers
- 1992 – Lester A. Slaback Jr.
- 1993 – Kenneth W. Skrable
- 1994 – Leroy F. Booth
- 1995 – William R. Casey
- 1996 – Frazier L. Bronson
- 1997 – Robert M. Ryan
- 1998 – Dale H. Denham
- 1999 – Bryce L. Rich
- 2000 – James E. Turner
- 2001 – George J. Vargo Jr.
- 2002 – Paul L. Ziemer
- 2003 – Herman Cember
- 2004 – Edward F. Maher
- 2005 – Dade W. Moeller
- 2006 – William C. Reinig
- 2007 – Kathryn H. Pryor
- 2008 – James S. Willison
- 2009 – Michael S. Terpilak
- 2010 – Nancy P. Kirner
- 2011 – Jerry W. Hiatt
- 2012 – Robert N. Cherry Jr.
- 2013 - Kent N. Lambert
- 2014 - Lester K. Aldrich II
- 2015 - Nora Nicholson
- 2016 - James E. Tarpinian
- 2017 - Charles A. "Gus" Potter
- 2018 - Govind Rao
- 2019 - Willam G. Rhodes III
- 2020 - Kathleen Dinnel-Jones
- 2021 - Wayne Gaul
- 2022 - Wei-Hsung Wang
- 2023 - Cindy M. Flannery

=== Joyce P. Davis Memorial Award ===
The Joyce P. Davis Memorial Award is given in memory and honor of Joyce P. Davis to those distinguished for excellence in professional achievement, outstanding ethical behavior, and interpersonal skills. It has been awarded to:

- 2022 - John J. Kelly
- 2004 - James E. Tarpinian
- 2006 - Carol D. Berger
- 2008 - Howard W. Dickson
- 2010 - Frazier L. Bronson
- 2014 - Bryce Rich
- 2016 - John Frazier
- 2018 - Charles Roessler
- 2019 - Dennis Quinn
- 2020 - Douglas Minnema
- 1999 - Bryce L. Rich
- 2000 - James E. Turner
- 2021 - Charles "Gus" Potter
- 2022 - Samuel L. Baker
- 2023 - James P. Tarzia

=== Academy of Service Award ===
The Academy of Service Award is awarded for exceptional service to the AAHP during the immediate Past President’s term of office. Recipients have been:

- Nancy Johnson, 2008
- E. Scott Medling, 2009
- Dan Strom, 2010
- Kyle Kleinhans, 2011
- Sandra J. Brereton, 2012
- Dan Mantooth, 2013
- James S. Willison, 2015
- Timothy Taulbee, 2017
- James Nunn, 2022
- Andy Miller, 2023

== Certification as health physicist ==
Certified Health Physicist is a title regulated by the American Board of Health Physics. It designates a health physicist certified in the application of health physics through competency and holistic review by the American Board of Health Physics. There are a number of requirements to obtain such certification.

== Other relevant organizations ==
- American Board of Medical Physics (ABMP)
- American Board of Radiology (ABR)
- American Board of Science in Nuclear Medicine (ABSNM)
- American College of Medical Physics (ACMP)
- American College of Radiology (ACR)
- The Canadian College of Physics in Medicine
- National Registry of Radiation Protection Technologists (NRRPT)
- American Association of Physicists in Medicine (AAPM)
