= Francis Bradley =

Francis Bradley may refer to:

- F. H. Bradley (Francis Herbert Bradley, 1846–1924), British philosopher
- Francis Wright Bradley (1884–1971), American educator, academic
- Francis Bradley (1899-????) horn player, son of Adolf Borsdorf
- Francis J. Bradley (1926–2021), American health physicist and writer

== See also ==
- Frank Bradley (disambiguation)
- Francis Bradley-Birt (1874–1963), British diplomat and writer
