= Marvin Goldman =

American radiation biologist (1928–2026)

Marvin Goldman (May 2, 1928 – July 20, 2026) was an American radiation biologist, known for "his highly significant contributions to the understanding of the effects of bone-seeking radionuclides—in carcinogenic characteristics of long-term strontium-90 exposures."

== Life and career ==
Marvin Goldman was born on May 2, 1928, in Brooklyn, New York City, where he was raised. He graduated from Erasmus Hall High School. Goldman received in 1949 a bachelor's degree in biology from Adelphi College (now named Adelphi University) and in 1949 an M.S. in zoology-physiology from the University of Maryland, College Park. From 1949 to 1951 at the University of Maryland he was a graduate student supported by a fellowship to study aviation physiology. In 1951 he began working in Operation Buster–Jangle at the Nevada Test Site to determine the pulmonary effects in animals exposed to fallout from nuclear weapons tests. In 1951, with two colleagues, he made the first detection of plutonium in lung tissue from animals that inhaled dust from U.S. nuclear bomb tests. After leaving the Nevada Test Site, he completed in 1957 his Ph.D. in radiation biology at the University of Rochester. His thesis advisor was Newell Stannard.

In December 1958 Goldman, with his wife and new-born child, moved to Davis, California; the University of California, Davis (UC Davis) hired him as a radiation biologist. He worked on a long-term project to determine the effects on beagles of low-level, chronic exposure to strontium-90.

In 1972 Goldman was one of five recipients of the Ernest Orlando Lawrence Award from the Atomic Energy Commission. For the academic year 1994–1995 he was the president of the Health Physics Society. In 1996 he was elected a fellow of the American Association for the Advancement of Science.

Goldman died on July 20, 2026, at the age of 98.

== Selected publications ==
- Goldman, M.; Glasser, S. R.; Tuttle, L. W. (1958). "Extraembryonic Vascular Deterioration in Irradiated Chick Embryo". Experimental Biology and Medicine. 97 (2): 385–387. doi:10.3181/00379727-97-23750. hdl:2027/mdp.39015095077015. PMID 13518282. S2CID 11738665.
- Goldman, Marvin; Tuttle, L. W. (1959). "Radiation and Hormone Effects Upon Lymphocyte Release from Isolated Perfused Dog Spleens". International Journal of Radiation Biology and Related Studies in Physics, Chemistry and Medicine. 1 (4): 403–413. doi:10.1080/09553005914550521. PMID 13850704.
- Goldman, M. (1982). "Ionizing radiation and its risks". The Western Journal of Medicine. 137 (6): 540–547. PMC 1274230. PMID 6761969.
- Goldman, M.; Dungworth, D. L.; Bulgin, M. S.; Rosenblatt, L. S.; Richards, W. P. C.; Bustad, L. K. (1969). "Radiation-Induced Neoplasms in Beagles after Administrations of ^{90}Sr and ^{226}Ra". In: Radiation-Induced Cancer. Proceedings of a Symposium on Radiation-Induced Cancer.
- Goldman, M.; Michaelson, S. M. (1970). "Large Animal Studies". In Sacher, G.A (ed.). In: Report ANL-7811. Conference on the estimation of low-level radiation effects in human populations [Argonne, Illinois[, December 7–9, 1970, edited by George A. Sacher. Argonne National Laboratory. p. 32. doi:10.2172/4708694.
- Raabe, Otto G.; Goldman, Marvin (1979). "A Predictive Model of Early Mortality Following Acute Inhalation of PuO_{2} Aerosols". Radiation Research. 78 (2): 264–277. Bibcode:1979RadR...78..264R. doi:10.2307/3575043. JSTOR 3575043. PMID 451156.
- Hayes, Thomas L.; Pawley, James B.; Fisher, Gerald L.; Goldman, Marvin (1980). "A model for the exposure of individual lung cells to the foreign elements contained in fly ash". Environmental Research. 22 (2): 499–509. Bibcode:1980ER.....22..499H. doi:10.1016/0013-9351(80)90161-9. PMID 7408830.
- Raabe, Otto G.; Book, Steven A.; Parks, Norris J.; Chrisp, Clarence E.; Goldman, Marvin (1981). "Lifetime Studies of ^{226}Ra and ^{90}Sr Toxicity in Beagles: A Status Report". Radiation Research. 86 (3): 515–528. Bibcode:1981RadR...86..515R. doi:10.2307/3575467. JSTOR 3575467. PMID 7244126.
- Goldman, Marvin (1987). "Chernobyl: a radiobiological perspective". Science. 238 (4827): 622–624. Bibcode:1987Sci...238..622G. doi:10.1126/science.3672115. PMID 3672115.
- Anspaugh, Lynn R.; Catlin, Robert J.; Goldman, Marvin (1988). "The Global Impact of the Chernobyl Reactor Accident". Science. 242 (4885): 1513–1519. Bibcode:1988Sci...242.1513A. doi:10.1126/science.3201240. PMID 3201240. 1988
- Goldman, Marvin; Nelson, Robert C.; Bollinger, Lance; Hoover, Mark D.; Templeton, William; Anspaugh, Lynn (1991). "Potential health risks from postulated accidents involving the Pu-238 RTG on the Ulysses solar exploration mission". AIP Conference Proceedings. Vol. 217. pp. 152–164. doi:10.1063/1.40028.
- Mossman, K. L.; Goldman, M.; Masse, F.; Mills, W. A.; Schiager, K. J.; Vetter, R. L. (1996). "Radiation risk in perspective" (PDF). Health Physics Society Newsletter. 24 (3). 1996
- Goldman, M. (1997). "The Russian radiation legacy: its integrated impact and lessons". Environmental Health Perspectives. 105 (Suppl 6): 1385–1391. doi:10.1289/ehp.97105s61385. PMC 1469939. PMID 9467049.
- Mossman, Kenneth L.; Planque, E.G. de; Goldman, Marvin; Kase, Kenneth R.; Magnusson, Sigurdur M.; Muntzing, L. Manning; Roessler, Genevieve S. (2001). "Bridging radiation policy and science. An International Conference, Airlie House Conference Center, Warrenton, VA 1–5 December 1999. Final Report". Reexamining the Scientific Basis for the Linear No-threshold Model of Low-dose Radiation: Hearing Before the Subcommittee on Energy and Environment of the Committee on Science, House of Representatives, One Hundred Sixth Congress, Second Session, July 18, 2000. U.S. Government Printing Office. pp. 357–384. ISBN 9780160656149.
