= Walter M. Nielsen =

American professor of physics

Walter McKinley Nielsen (December 18, 1900, Tyler, Minnesota – January 8, 1981) was an American professor of physics and one of the founders of Duke University's physics department.

== Biography ==
Nielsen studied at the University of Minnesota, completing a bachelor's degree in electrical engineering in 1922 and a Ph.D. in physics in 1925. He was the third person to join the physics department at the newly endowed Duke University. There he was an instructor from 1925 to 1928, an assistant professor from 1928 to 1937, and a full professor from 1937 to 1966, when he retired as professor emeritus. He was on leave of absence for the academic year 1929–1930 as a National Research Council Fellow at the Bartol Research Foundation and during World War II.

His promotion of research and leadership brought Duke University's physics department "into international prominence." Under his influence, Duke University's physics department appointed a number of outstanding physicists, including Martin M. Block, William M. Fairbank, Walter Gordy, Fritz London, Henry W. Newson, Lothar Wolfgang Nordheim, and Hertha Sponer. Nielsen’s doctoral students include Karl Z. Morgan.

Nielsen chaired the Duke University Council for many years, the Council of the Oak Ridge Institute of Nuclear Studies (of which he was a member from 1946 to 1959), and the Southeastern Section of the American Physical Society (APS) for one year.

In 1937 he was elected a Fellows of the American Physical Society. In 1946 he received the Navy Distinguished Civilian Service Award with citation for "outstanding service to the Navy in the field of degaussing and magnetic stabilization of ships".

In 1928 he married Katharine Phelps Tryon (1901–1975). They had two sons and a daughter. In retirement Walter and Katharine Nielsen lived in their house built in 1937 in Durham, North Carolina and in their smaller house near Boone, North Carolina in the Blue Ridge Mountains. There he made a large collection of photographs of wildflowers.

== Selected publications ==
- Nielsen, Walter M. (1926). "The Formation of Negative Ions in Mercury Vapor". Physical Review. 27 (6): 716–723. doi:10.1103/PhysRev.27.716.
- Nielsen, Walter M. (1930). "Magnetic Analysis of Negative Ions in Mercury Vapor". Proceedings of the National Academy of Sciences. 16 (11): 721–727. doi:10.1073/pnas.16.11.721. PMC 526724. PMID 16577299.
- Nielsen, Walter M. (1931). "On Some of the New Ultra-Ionization Potentials of Mercury Vapor". Physical Review. 37: 87–88. doi:10.1103/PhysRev.37.87.2.
- Carpenter, David W.; Nielsen, Walter M. (1934). "Effect of Temperature and Pressure on the Mercury Afterglow". Physical Review. 46 (7): 607–612. doi:10.1103/PhysRev.46.607.
- Mann, M. M.; Nielsen, Walter M. (1934). "The Effect of Hydrogen on the Afterglow in Mercury Vapor". Physical Review. 46 (11): 991–994. doi:10.1103/PhysRev.46.991.
- Morgan, J. E.; Nielsen, W. M. (1935). "Shower Production in Small Thicknesses of Lead and Other Elements". Physical Review. 48 (9): 773–774. doi:10.1103/PhysRev.48.773.
- Morgan, Karl Z.; Nielsen, W. M. (1937). "Shower Production Under Thick Layers of Various Materials". Physical Review. 52 (6): 564–567. doi:10.1103/PhysRev.52.564.
- Nielsen, W. M.; Morgan, J. E. (1937). "Note on the Production of Showers in Various Materials". Physical Review. 52 (6): 568–569. doi:10.1103/PhysRev.52.568.
- Nielsen, W.M. (1938). "Primary and secondary cosmic rays, showers and burst". Journal of the Franklin Institute. 226 (5): 601–622. doi:10.1016/S0016-0032(38)90075-4.
- Nielsen, W. M.; Morgan, K. Z. (1938). "The Absorption of the Penetrating Component of the Cosmic Radiation". Physical Review. 54 (4): 245–248. doi:10.1103/PhysRev.54.245.
- Nielsen, W. M.; Ryerson, C. M.; Nordheim, L. W.; Morgan, K. Z. (1941). "Differential Measurement of the Meson Lifetime". Physical Review. 59 (7): 547–553. doi:10.1103/PhysRev.59.547.
