= Carl B. Braestrup =

American physicist (1897–1982)

- Born: Carl Bjorn Braestrup; April 13, 1897; Copenhagen, Denmark
- Died: August 8, 1982 (aged 85); Middletown, Connecticut, U.S.
- Education: Carnegie Institute of Technology; Massachusetts Institute of Technology (BSc)
- Spouse: Elsebet Kampmann (m. 1928)
- Children: 2, including Peter
- Scientific career
- Fields: Radiation physics
- Workplaces: Bell Telephone Laboratories; Picker X-Ray Corporation; Columbia University; NYC Department of Hospitals; Oak Ridge National Laboratory

Carl Bjorn Braestrup (April 13, 1897 – August 8, 1982) was an American physicist, engineer and inventor who specialised in radiation safety at the New York Department of Hospitals and Columbia University.

== Early life ==
Carl Bjorn Braestrup was born in Copenhagen, Denmark, on April 13, 1897, the son of a Danish naval officer. In 1919 Braestrup emigrated to the United States.

He studied at Carnegie Institute of Technology in Pittsburgh and Massachusetts Institute of Technology (MIT), graduating with a bachelor of science from MIT in 1922.

== Career ==
After graduation Braestrup worked as an engineer for Bell Telephone Laboratories and Picker X-Ray Company.

In 1928 he began working part-time for Columbia University in New York City. From 1929 until 1966 he was director of the physics laboratory of the New York Department of Hospitals.

In the early 1930s Braestrup developed one of the first film badge dosimeter to detect radiation exposure, a design later adopted by the Manhattan Project, the secret project to develop the atomic bomb. Braestrup was part of the team at Columbia University taking part in the Manhattan Project. His work focussed on assessing and minimising the radiation hazard to personnel. His involvement in the atomic weapons program continued after the war, working as a consultant during the nuclear testings at Bikini Atoll. From 1952 to 1963 he worked at Oak Ridge National Laboratory in Tennessee on radiation shielding and plant inspections.

In 1953 Braestrup and D. T. Green patented the Theratron, a machine for irradiating tumours with a focused beam of cobalt radiation which was designed to minimise the exposure to radiation of the health workers applying the treatment.

His 1958 book, Radiation Protection, co-authored with Harold Orville Wyckoff, was the first textbook on radiation safety. With Richard T. Mooney, Braestrup investigated x-ray emissions from televisions. Their safety recommendations were adopted by the federal government.

== Personal life and death ==
In 1928 Braestrup married Elsebet Kampmann. They had two children, their son Peter was a correspondent for The New York Times and The Washington Post.

Braestrup died on August 8, 1982, aged 85 in Middletown, Connecticut from complications following a stroke.

== Books ==
- Braestrup, Carl B.; Wyckoff, Harold Orville (1958). Radiation Protection. Charles C. Thomas Publisher.
- Braestrup, C. B.; Vikterlöf, K. J. (1974). Manual on Radiation Protection in Hospitals and General Practice. Vol. 1. Geneva: World Health Organization. hdl:10665/39917. ISBN 978-9-24-154038-4.
