= Health Physics (journal) =

- Discipline: Radiobiology
- Language: English
- Edited by: Brant Ulsh

Publication details
- History: 1958–present
- Publisher: Lippincott Williams & Wilkins
- Frequency: Monthly
- Open access: Hybrid
- Impact factor: 0.993 (2017)

Standard abbreviations
- ISO 4: Health Phys.

Indexing
- CODEN: HLTPAO
- ISSN: 0017-9078 (print); 1538-5159 (web)
- LCCN: 58004840
- OCLC no.: 10125549

Links
- Journal homepage; Online access; Online archive

Health Physics is a monthly peer-reviewed medical journal published by Lippincott Williams & Wilkins. Its scope includes research into radiation safety and healthcare applications. It is the official journal of the Health Physics Society. It was established in 1958 and it is edited by Brant Ulsh.

Operational Radiation Safety is published as a quarterly supplement to Health Physics.

== Abstracting and indexing ==
The journal is abstracted and indexed in:

- Chemical Abstracts Service
- Index Medicus/MEDLINE/PubMed
- Science Citation Index
- Current Contents/Agriculture, Biology & Environmental Sciences
- BIOSIS Previews

According to the Journal Citation Reports, the journal has a 2014 impact factor of 1.271.
