= David Lee (organist) =

Australian organist and musician (1837-1897)

David Lee (20 March 1837 – 13 May 1897) was a musician in Melbourne, Australia, as conductor, director and organist, notably as City Organist 1877–1897.

== History ==
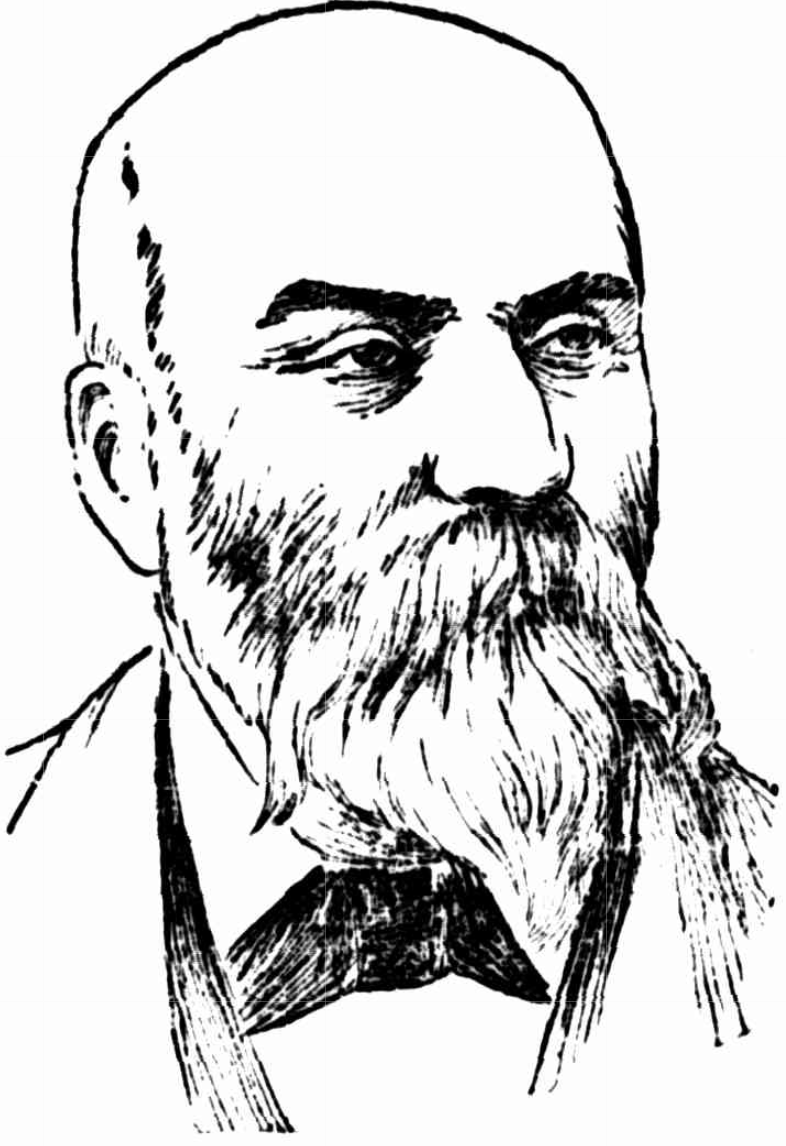
Lee in 1897

Lee was born in Armagh, Ireland, to English parents. He attended Armagh Cathedral School (Note: It may be assumed that he attended St Patrick's Cathedral, Armagh (Church of Ireland), the Anglican cathedral, not the Catholic cathedral, also called St Patrick's.) from the age of four, and was trained as a chorister, meanwhile also studying organ playing. By age twelve he had progressed sufficiently to be appointed deputy organist of the cathedral. On leaving school he was employed as a clerk by the Provincial Bank of Ireland, remaining in their employ for 11 years. In 1864 he left for Melbourne on the advice of his brother Harcourt Lee. (Note: Harcourt Lee (c. September 1861 – 8 August 1935) of Erskineville and Pyrmont, married to Jane)

He arrived in Melbourne in 1864, and was appointed organist to St Stephen's Anglican Church, Richmond, Victoria and the Independent Church, Collins Street. He also served at Christ Church, St Kilda, Victoria, and St Andrews Anglican Church, Brighton, Victoria. He was soon appointed organist to St Luke's Anglican Church, South Melbourne (earlier known as Emerald Hill), and founded the Emerald Hill Philharmonic Society.

In 1877 he married Mary McKenzie Johnson, (died 26 July 1891) eldest daughter of Archibald Johnson, of an old Victorian family.

=== Town Hall organ ===
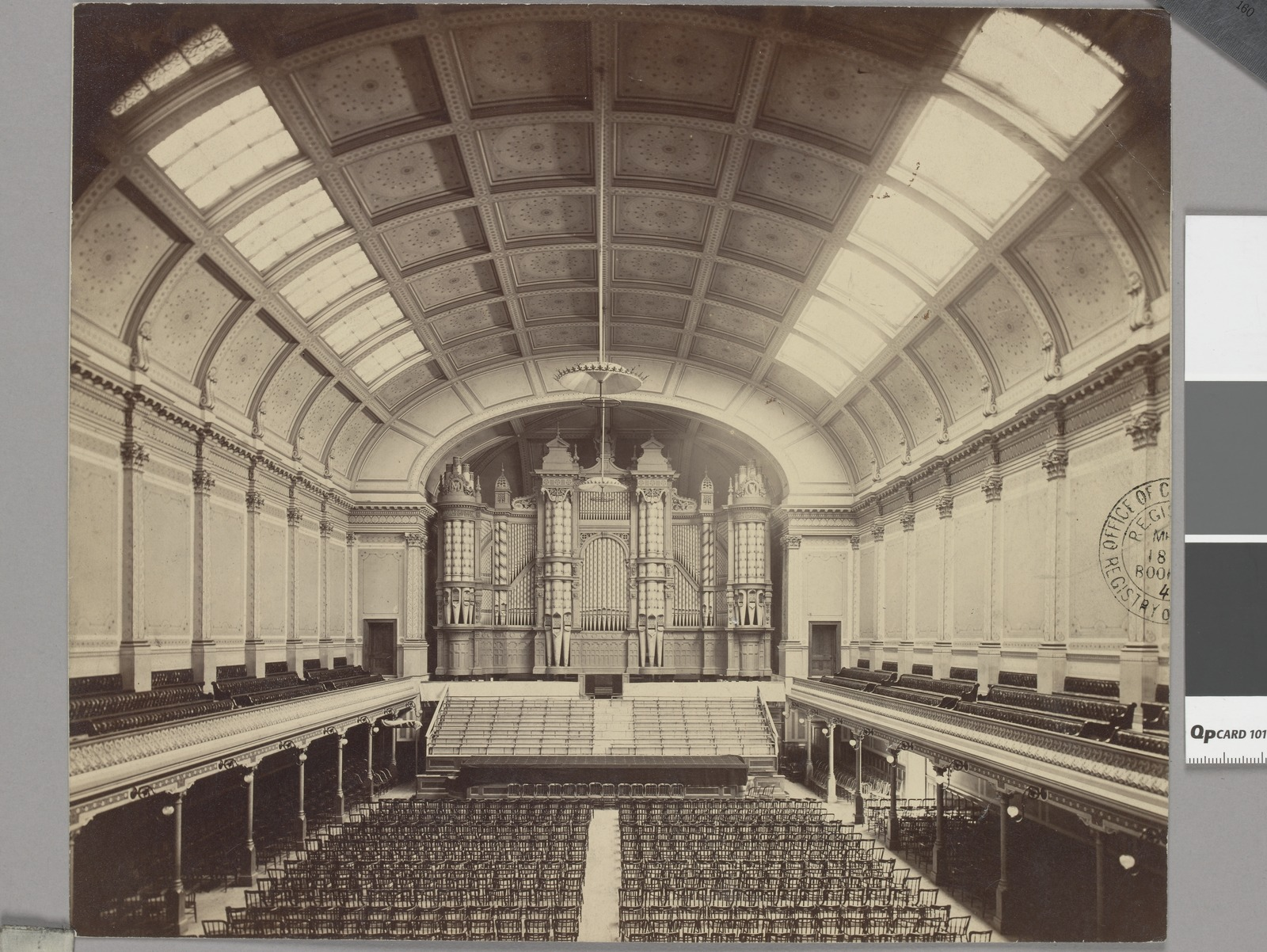
The Organ in 1872

In February 1870 the decision was made to accept a tender Hill and Sons to build a grand organ for the new Town Hall for £1,000. (Note: The final cost of the organ, with transport, installation and modifications, was reckoned at £7,000.) It would have 75 stops and over 4,000 pipes. They had the opinions of James Turle, the organist at Westminster Abbey, and E. J. Hopkins, the organist at Temple Church, that it would be the ideal instrument for the location and the variety of works likely to be produced. It was largely assembled and tested to the satisfaction of the referees at Hill & Sons' factory in London but controversy attended its installation, and the organ was opened in an unfinished state (minus the reed pipes) by Lee on 8 August 1872. A subsequent public concert was poorly attended as it had been injudiciously programmed for the same evening as an opera concert, and with an only part-filled hall the concert was spoiled by echoes. The council called for expressions of interest for the position of organist at a salary of £150 per annum. Very few credible applications were received as a consequence of the miserly figure, and no appointment was made. In 1877 the position was again advertised, at a salary of £300 p.a., with The Herald questioning the need for such a position, preferring it to be split, with fees paid per performance. Such a proposition was put to the council but negatived, and in November 1877 Lee was appointed an played his first concert as city organist on 24 November 1877.

Lee remained City Organist to the year he died, but was criticised by visiting organist Frank Bradley for his proprietorial attitude toward the organ, allowing no-one to play it but himself, thus depriving other musicians the opportunity of experiencing one of the finest instruments in Australia.

He acted as "next friend" in the action the children of Archibald Johnson took against the provisions of his will, which left most of his great wealth to his widow (who had subsequently married Alfred McNaughton Nicholas) and little or nothing to his children.

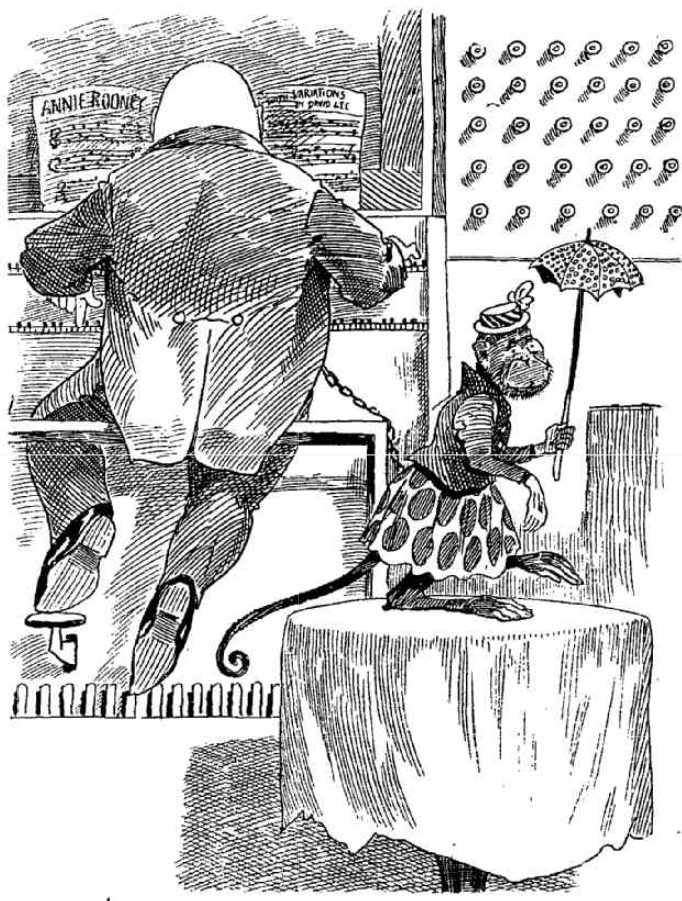
"The One Thing Needed"

Lee's wife died in 1891 at their home in South Yarra. Around this time, public attention was drawn to the low attendance figures for the Thursday organ concerts at the Town Hall. His programmes were criticised alternately for being esoteric and juvenile but they did not come; and the empty seats exaggerated the Town Hall's reverberation problems. The council was divided: some wanted to rotate the position of organist, but that would mean sacking Lee, an acknowledged master of the instrument and a faithful servant. Melbourne Punch suggested a leaf could be taken from vaudeville's playbook: Lee could interpret his performance with a soft shoe shuffle, accompanied by a performing monkey.

In 1894 he broke his right arm in a railway incident, having fallen to the platform while attempting to alight from a moving train. He was charged with the offence, but the case was dropped. Lee then sued the railways for £1,500 damages, but lost.

Lee died of kidney failure following a brief but painful illness; he was found to be destitute and insolvent. His landlady swore that Lee had made over all his possessions to her in lieu of rent, but other creditors claimed priority. He had no children.

W. G. Price was in 1906 the next appointment as organist to the City of Melbourne.
