= Karl Z. Morgan =

American physicist (1907–1999)

Karl Ziegler Morgan
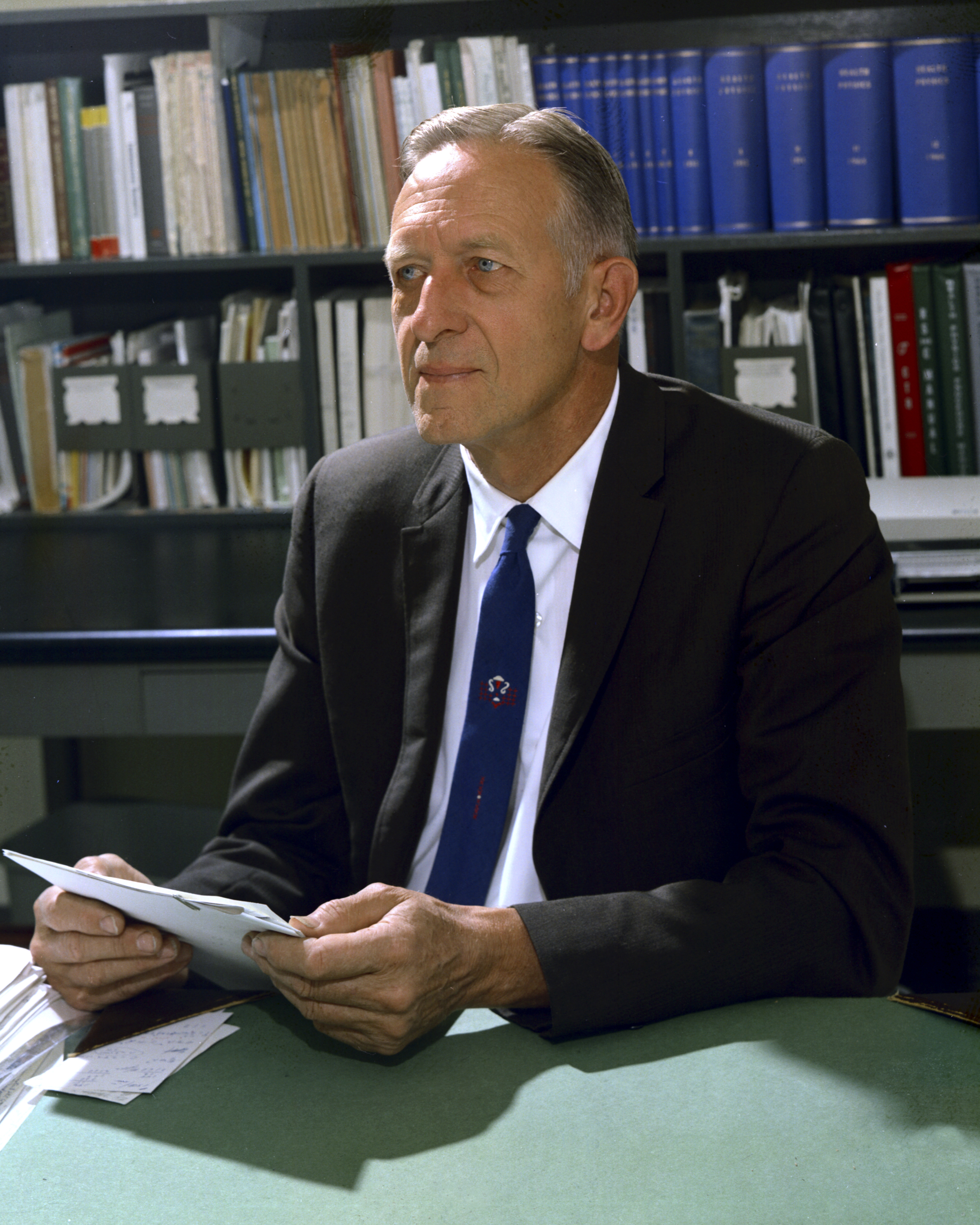
- Karl Morgan in 1995
- Born: 27 September 1907; Enochville, North Carolina, USA
- Died: 8 June 1999 (aged 91); Oak Ridge, Tennessee, USA
- Awards: Gold Medal for Radiation Protection (1962)
- Scientific career
- Fields: Radiation Health Physics
- Doctoral advisor: Walter M. Nielsen

Karl Ziegler Morgan (September 27, 1907 – June 8, 1999), was an American physicist who was one of the founders of the field of radiation health physics. For almost three decades, he worked for the Oak Ridge National Laboratory.

Late in life, in 1982 he became a critic of nuclear power and nuclear weapons production.

== Early life and education ==
Born in Enochville, North Carolina in 1907, Karl Morgan attended Lenoir-Rhyne College (now University) as a freshman and sophomore and then transferred to the University of North Carolina, where he graduated with bachelor's and master's degrees in physics and mathematics. He continued graduate study in physics at Duke University, where he received a PhD degree in 1934 for research into cosmic radiation.

== Career ==
He began an academic career as a faculty member at Lenoir Rhyne College, and was part of the Manhattan Project.

Morgan was initially at the University of Chicago Metallurgical Laboratory and later in Oak Ridge.

He worked for Oak Ridge National Laboratory (ORNL) and Health Physics Society in executive roles.

After his retirement from ORNL in 1972, he joined the faculty of Georgia Institute of Technology as professor of nuclear energy in the school of nuclear engineering, retiring from that position in 1982. Thereafter he became a consulting professor at Appalachian State University.

Morgan died in Oak Ridge, Tennessee, on June 8, 1999, apparently from a ruptured aortic aneurysm.

== Reception ==
John Cameron, a developer of a dosimeter in the 1960s, criticized Morgan's autobiography. He wrote a posthumous critique, called the book otherwise interesting for its historical detailing of the Manhattan Project's health physics evolution and criticized what he called generally "flawed" anti-nuclear stance, an exaggeration of the Linear no-threshold model.

== See also ==
- Anti-nuclear movement in the United States
- List of nuclear whistleblowers
- Nuclear safety
