= James Newell Stannard =

American scientist (1910–2005)

- James Newell Stannard
- Born: January 2, 1910; Owego, New York
- Died: September 19, 2005 (aged 95); San Diego, California
- Other name: J. Newell Stannard
- Citizenship: United States
- Education: Oberlin College; AB 1931; Harvard University; MA 1934; Harvard University; Ph.D. 1935
- Known for: University of Rochester; Atomic Energy Project
- Spouse(s): Grace L. Kingsley; 1911-1991; Helena R. Woodhouse; 1994-2005
- Children: Susan L. (Stannard) Frazier; 1942-
- Awards: Health Physics Society; Distinguished Scientific Achievement Award; Founders Award; Fellow Award; J. Newell Stannard Lecture Series “Excellence in Radiation Protection” Annual Symposium
- Scientific career
- Fields: Radiobiologist; Pharmacologist; Physiologist
- Workplaces: University of Rochester; Emory University; National Institutes of Health; University of Rochester; University of California; San Diego
- Thesis: Rate Limiting Metabolic Processes in the Yeast (1934-1935)
- Doctoral advisor: Dr. Theodore Stier
- Other academic advisors: Dr. Theodore Stier
- Doctoral students: Marvin Goldman

James Newell Stannard (2 January 1910 – 19 September 2005) is a radiobiologist, pharmacologist and physiologist at the National Institutes of Health.

== Atomic Energy Project ==
The Atomic Energy Project at the University of Rochester was a graduate teaching program. The project had three divisions. William Freer Bale headed the Radiology and Biophysics division that worked largely on radioactive materials—for example, radium, radon, plutonium, and polonium. Stannard was responsible for 2 sections, the Radiation Toxicology section and the Radioautography section. Harold Hodge headed the Pharmacology and Toxicology division that focused on Uranium including inhalation studies. Joe W. Howland, M.D. headed the clinically oriented Medical Services division. Herbert Mermagen worked in the Medical Physics section was a radiological physicist, known today as a health physicist.

== Health Physics Society ==
=== Service ===
- Education and Training Committee, Chairman
- Board of Directors, 1965–1971
- President-Elect, 1968–1969
- President, 1969–1970

=== Awards and honors ===
- Distinguished Scientific Achievement Award
- Founders Award
- Fellow Award
- J. Newell Stannard Lecture Series, “Excellence in Radiation Protection”, annual symposium
