= Peter Braestrup =

- Born: June 8, 1929; Manhattan, New York
- Died: August 10, 1997 (aged 68); Rockport, Maine
- Education: Yale University
- Father: Carl B. Braestrup

Peter Braestrup (June 8, 1929 – August 10, 1997) was a correspondent for The New York Times and The Washington Post, founding editor of The Wilson Quarterly, and later senior editor and director of communications for the Library of Congress. Retiring from journalism in 1973, he founded the Woodrow Wilson International Center for Scholars' Wilson Quarterly, and in 1989 moved to the Library of Congress.

Braestrup's 1977 Freedom House-sponsored book, the two-volume Big Story, criticized US media coverage of the Vietnam War's 1968 Tet Offensive. The book, which argued that the media coverage of the offensive was excessively negative and helped lose the war. According to Herman and Chomsky, who challenge it, it "is regularly cited by historians, without qualification, as the standard work on media reporting of the Tet offensive".

== Background ==
Braestrup was born in Manhattan, the son of Carl Bjorn Braestrup, a physicist who worked on the Manhattan Project. He graduated from Yale University in 1951, and served six months in the Korean War, being discharged in 1953 after being seriously wounded in action.

== Career ==
From 1953 to 1957, Braestrup worked for TIME magazine, as contributing editor and then as a reporter. He moved to the New York Herald Tribune in 1957, and after being Nieman Fellow at Harvard University (1959–60) moved to The New York Times. He worked for the Times initially in Washington, then in Paris, North Africa (including the Algerian War), and Thailand. He resigned in 1968 to join the Washington Post, being its Saigon bureau chief until 1973.

At the end of the Vietnam War, Braestrup retired from journalism, moving to the Woodrow Wilson International Center for Scholars, and founding its Wilson Quarterly in 1976. In 1989, he became senior editor and director of communications for the Library of Congress.

== Books ==
- Big Story: How the American Press and Television Reported and Interpreted the Crisis of Tet 1968 in Vietnam and Washington, Boulder, Colorado: Westview Press, 1977
