= Leo K. Bustad =

Leo Kenneth Bustad (January 10, 1920, Stanwood, Washington – September 19, 1998, Pullman, Washington) was a veterinarian, physiologist, and dean of veterinary medicine. He is known for his work on human–animal bonding.

== Biography ==
His parents were Norwegian immigrants. He grew up on a farm and learned Norwegian as his first language — he was introduced to English when his older brother started school. Leo Bustad graduated in 1941 with a bachelor's degree in agriculture from Washington State College (renamed in 1959 as Washington State University) (WSU). Upon his graduation he was commissioned a second lieutenant in the U.S. Army. In June 1942 at the Fort Benning chapel, he married Signe Byrd, a former classmate in Washington state. During WW II, Leo Bustad was in combat in Italy and Germany and spent 15 months as a prisoner of war in a German prison camp. After his return to the U.S.A., he graduated from Washington State College in 1948 with a master's degree in animal nutrition and in 1949 with a D.V.M.

From 1949 to 1965 Bustad performed and directed biological research at the Hanford Laboratories located in the Hanford Site in Washington state. In 1960 he graduated with a Ph.D. in physiology from the University of Washington School of Medicine, with financial assistance from a National Science Foundation postdoctoral fellowship. From 1965 to 1973 he was the director of the Radiobiology Laboratory and Comparative Oncology Laboratory at the University of California, Davis. From 1973 to 1983 at Washington State University's College of Veterinary Medicine, he was a professor of veterinary physiology and dean of the College. Upon his retirement in 1983 he retained the title of professor emeritus and maintained a half-time appointment in WSU's College of Veterinary Medicine. During his career he was the author or co-author of over 200 articles. He was a consultant to the Surgeon General of the U.S. Air Force.

Bustad was the director of the People-Pet Partnership (co-founded by Linda M. Hines) from 1979 to 1998. In 1979 he gave the Wesley Spink Memorial Lecture at the University of Minnesota's Department of Medicine. In 1987 he was of the founders of the journal Anthrozoös. He was the keynote speaker at the opening dedication of the WSU Veterans' Memorial on Veterans Day in 1993.

He was named 1981's Outstanding Veterinarian of the Year by the Washington State Veterinary Medical Association. In 1985, Washington State University dedicated the Veterinary Science Building in his honor and also honored him with the WSU Regents Distinguished Alumnus Award — the 20th alumnus to be recognized with WSU's highest honor. In 1988 he was elected a member of the National Academy of Medicine. Washington State University sponsored a symposium held from October 18 to 20, 2013 in honor of his legacy.

Bustad was predeceased by his wife, Signe Byrd Bustad (1919–1998), and a daughter, Karen Ann Bustad (1949–1983). Upon his death he was survived by a son, a daughter, and a grandson.

== Selected publications ==
=== Articles ===
- Cunha, T. J.; Colby, R. W.; Bustad, L. K.; Bone, J. F. (1948). "The Need for and Interrelationship of Folic Acid, Anti-Pernicious Anemia Liver Extract, and Biotin in the Pig". The Journal of Nutrition. 36 (2): 215–229. doi:10.1093/jn/36.2.215. PMID 18876485.
- Bustad, L. K.; Marks, S.; George, L. A.; Seigneur, L. J. (1957). "Thyroid Adenomas in Sheep administered Iodine-131 Daily". Nature. 179 (4561): 677. Bibcode:1957Natur.179..677B. doi:10.1038/179677a0. PMID 13418765. S2CID 4186709.
- Marks, Sidney; George, Lynn A.; Bustad, Leo K. (1957). "Fibrosarcoma involving the thyroid gland of a sheep given I131 daily". Cancer. 10 (3): 587–591. doi:10.1002/1097-0142(195705/06)10:3<587::AID-CNCR2820100325>3.0.CO;2-T. PMID 13460954. S2CID 33234924.
- "Host Reaction to Disease: Application of Radionuclides by Leo K. Bustad and R. O. McClellan". ARS 45-5. Factors Involved in Host-Agent Relationships. A symposium held at the dedication of the National Animal Disease Laboratory, Ames, Iowa, December 12 and 13, 1961. Agriculture Research Service, United States Department of Agriculture. 1966. pp. 94–110.
- Bustad, L. K.; McClellan, R. O. (1966). "Swine in Biomedical Research". Science. 152 (3728): 1526–1530. Bibcode:1966Sci...152.1526B. doi:10.1126/science.152.3728.1526. PMID 17788035.
- Bustad, Leo K. & Staff (June 1968). Annual Report, Fiscal Year 1968. No. UCD-472-115. University of California, Davis, Radiobiology Laboratory, School of Veterinary Medicine. doi:10.2172/4784499. OSTI 4784499.
- Bustad, L. K. (1970). "The Experimental Subject—a Choice, Not an Echo". Perspectives in Biology and Medicine. 14 (1): iii-10. doi:10.1353/pbm.1970.0003. PMID 4992486. S2CID 8250691.
- Wolfe, L. G.; Deinhardt, F.; Theilen, G. H.; Rabin, H.; Kawakami, T.; Bustad, L. K. (1971). Wolfe, Lauren G.; Deinhardt, Friedrich; Theilen, Gordon H.; Rabin, Harvey; Kawakami, Tom; Bustad, Leo K. (eds.). "Induction of Tumors in Marmoset Monkeys by Simian Sarcoma Virus, Type 1 (Lagothrix): A Preliminary Report". JNCI: Journal of the National Cancer Institute. 47 (5): 1115–1120. doi:10.1093/jnci/47.5.1115. PMID 5001258.
- Book, Steven A.; Bustad, Leo K. (1974). "The Fetal and Neonatal Pig in Biomedical Research". Journal of Animal Science. 38 (5): 997–1002. doi:10.2527/jas1974.385997x. PMID 4596894.
- Kawakami, T. G.; Buckley, P. M.; Depaoli, A.; Noll, W.; Bustad, L. K. (1975). "Studies on the prevalence of type C virus associated with gibbon hematopoietic neoplasms". Bibliotheca Haematologica. International Symposium on Comparative Leukemia Research. 40 (40): 385–389. doi:10.1159/000397556. ISBN 978-3-8055-2090-4. PMID 51628.
- Bustad, L. K.; Hines, L. (1984). "Our Professional Responsibilities Relative to Human-Animal Interactions". The Canadian Veterinary Journal. 25 (10): 369–376. PMC 1790657. PMID 17422458.
- Bustad, Leo K. (1989). "Editorial". Anthrozoös. 2 (4): 219–220. doi:10.2752/089279389787057849.

=== Books ===
- Bustad, L. K., ed. (22 October 2013). Biology of Radioiodine: Proceedings of the Hanford Symposium on the Biology of Radioiodine. Elsevier. ISBN 9781483282763. (reprint of 1964 original edition)
- Bustad, Leo K.; McClellan, Roger O., eds. (1966). Swine in biomedical research; proceedings of a symposium at the Pacific Northwest Laboratory, Richland, Washington, July 19-22, 1965. Richland, Washington: Battelle Memorial Institute, Pacific Northwest Laboratory; with M. Paul Burns, technical editor
- Goldman, Marvin; Bustad, Leo K., eds. (1972). Biomedical implications of radiostrontium exposure; proceedings of a symposium held at Davis, California, February 22-24, 1971. Oak Ridge, Tennessee: U.S. Atomic Energy Commission, Office of Information Services; [available from National Technical Information Service, U.S. Dept. of Commerce, Springfield, Va.]
- Bustad, Leo K. (20 February 1981). Animals, Aging, and the Aged. University of Minnesota Press. ISBN 9780816657162.
- Vaughan, Sherry C.; Bustad, Leo K. (1988). Learning and Living Together: Building the Human-animal Bond (2nd rev. ed.). PPP, College of Veterinary Medicine, Washington State University. (1st edition in 1986)
- Reverence for Life: Lecture Series/ Dr. Leo Bustad. Louisiana State University School of Veterinary Medicine. 1988.
- Compassion: Our Last Great Hope / Selected Speeches of Leo K. Bustad (2nd ed.). Renton, Washington: Delta Society. 1996. ISBN 9781889785004. (1st edition in 1990)
