= Dade Moeller =

Dade William Moeller
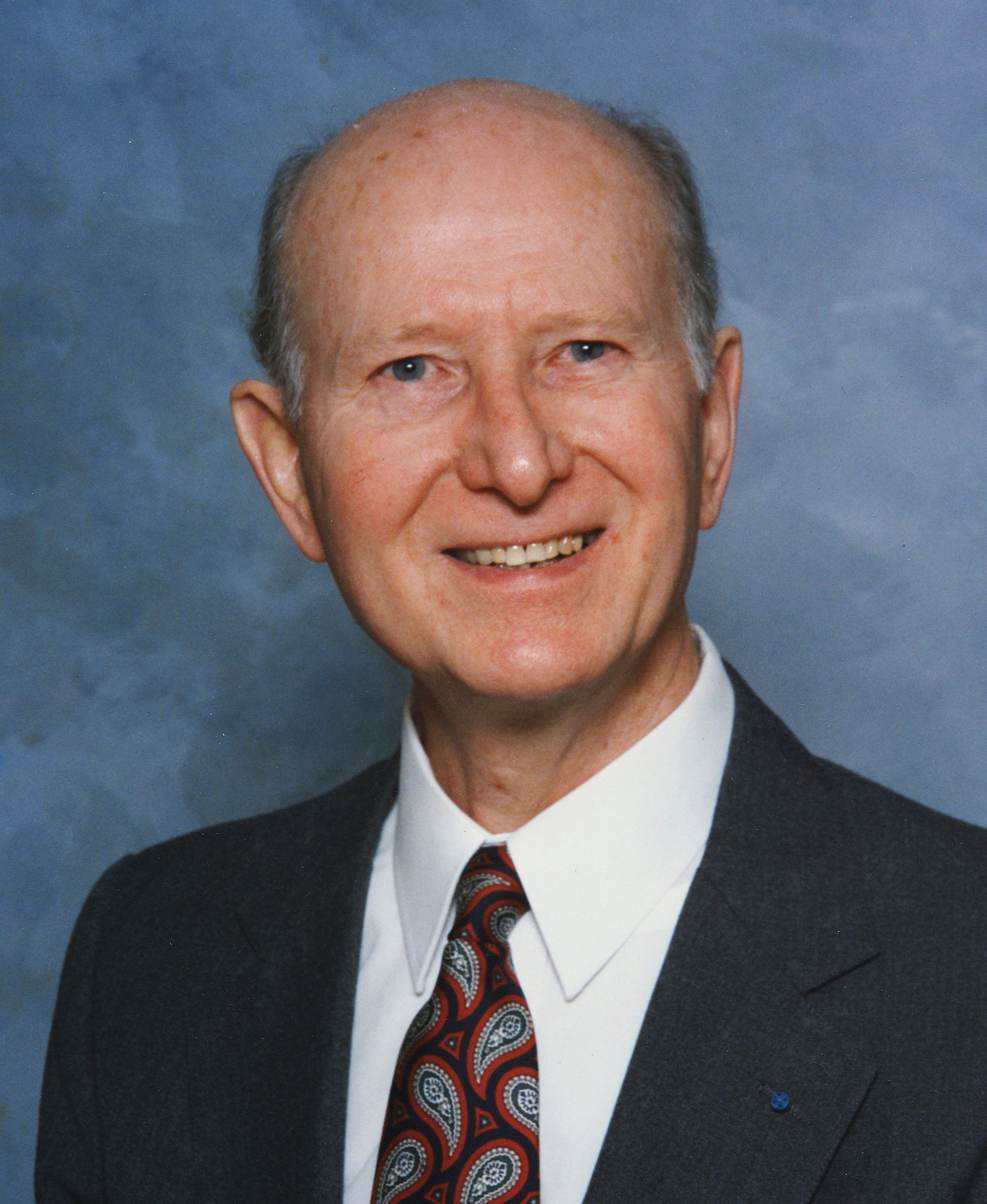
- Born: February 27, 1927; Grant, Florida, U.S.
- Died: September 26, 2011 (aged 84); New Bern, North Carolina, U.S.
- Resting place: New Bern, North Carolina
- Other name: Dade Moeller
- Education: Georgia Tech; North Carolina State University
- Spouse: Betty Jean Radford
- Children: 5
- Awards: U.S. NRC Meritorious Achievement Award, 1988; Distinguished Emeritus Member of the NCRP, 1997; Georgia Institute of Technology; Engineering Hall of Fame, 1999; North Carolina State University; Engineering Alumnus of the Year, 2001; Health Physics Society; Robley D. Evans Commemorative Medal, 2003; American Academy of Health Physics; William McAdams Outstanding Service Award, 2005; Harvard University School of Public Health; Professor Emeritus Award of Merit, 2006
- Scientific career
- Fields: Health physics; Radiation protection; Environmental protection
- Workplaces: U.S. Public Health Service; Los Alamos National Laboratory; Oak Ridge National Laboratories; USPHS Radiological Health Training Program; Northeastern Radiological Health Laboratory; Harvard School of Public Health; Dade Moeller & Associates
- Thesis: Radionuclides in Reactor Cooling Water-Identification, Source and Control (1957)

Dade Moeller (February 27, 1927 – September 26, 2011) was an internationally known expert in radiation safety and environmental protection.

== Life ==
Dade William Moeller, Ph.D., CHP, P.E. was born in 1927 in Grant, Florida, a fishing community located on the intracoastal waterway near the Atlantic Ocean. His father was Robert A. Moeller and his mother was Victoria Moeller and he had 4 brothers, Charles E. Moeller, Robert L. Moeller, John A. Moeller, and Ken L. Moeller. In 1949 he married Betty Jean Radford 'Jeanie' of Decatur, Georgia. Moeller died at home from complications due to malignant lymphoma on September 26, 2011.

=== Military service and education ===
He passed the V-12 Navy College Training Program, and joined the U.S. Navy in 1944. Moeller attended Georgia Tech and graduated magna cum laude with a Bachelor of Science degree in civil engineering in 1947 and a Master of Science degree in environmental engineering in 1948. After graduating, Dade became a commissioned officer in the U.S. Public Health Service, with assignments that included Oak Ridge National Laboratory, Los Alamos National Laboratory, and the Headquarters office in Washington, D.C.

In 1957 with sponsorship from the U.S. Public Health Service, Moeller earned the Doctor of Philosophy degree in nuclear engineering from North Carolina State University. He taught radiation protection courses at the U.S. Public Health Service's Radiological Health Training Center in Cincinnati, Ohio. In 1959, Moeller joined the Health Physics Society and became a certified health physicist and a certified environmental engineer. In 1961, he became the officer in charge at the Northeastern Radiological Health Laboratory in Winchester, Massachusetts, and studied radioactive fallout from atomic weapons testing and monitored children's thyroids for the uptake of radioactive iodine. In 1966 Moeller retired from the U.S. Public Health Service.

=== Harvard School of Public Health ===
Moeller held tenure for 26 years and served as:

- Professor of Engineering in Environmental Health
- Associate Director of the Kresge Center for Environmental Health
- Associate Director of the Harvard-National Institute of Environmental Health Sciences Center for Environmental Health
- Chairman of the Department of Environmental Health Sciences
- Associate Dean for Continuing Education
- Taught in the Center for Continuing Professional Education

=== Memberships ===
- American Association for the Advancement of Science
- American Industrial Hygiene Association
- American Nuclear Society
- American Public Health Association
- Health Physics Society

=== Awards and honors ===
- Health Physics Society, Fellow, 1968
- National Academy of Engineering, Fellow, 1978
- American Public Health Association, Fellow, 1988
- American Nuclear Society, Fellow, 1988
- U.S. Nuclear Regulatory Commission, Meritorious Achievement Award, 1988
- National Council on Radiological Protection and Measurements, Distinguished Emeritus Member, 1997
- Georgia Institute of Technology, Engineering Hall of Fame, 1999
- NC State University, Distinguished Engineering Alumni Award, 2001
- Health Physics Society, Robley D. Evans Commemorative Medal, 2003
- William McAdams Outstanding Service Award, American Academy of Health Physics, 2005
- Professor Emeritus Award of Merit, Harvard University School of Public Health, 2006

=== Patents ===
- Method and apparatus for reduction of radon decay product exposure.
- Radon decay product removal unit as adapted for use with a lamp.

== Select publications ==
=== Thesis ===
- Radionuclides in Reactor Cooling Water-Identification, Source and Control. (1957).
