= G. W. C. Tait =

Health physicist (1912–1993)

George William Campbell Tait (April 28, 1912 – March 9, 1993) was an inventor and pioneer in the field of health physics in Canada and at the Chalk River Project.

Tait lived in Canada and Vienna. His residences included Deep River, Ontario, Canada, and Gibsons, British Columbia, Canada and Vienna, Austria. 1951–1958, Head of Radiation Hazard Control, National Research Council, Chalk River Project, Atomic Energy of Canada Limited. 1958–1960, Director, Division of Health Safety and Waste Disposal, International Atomic Energy Agency, Vienna, Austria. Tait was involved in early work at the Chalk River Project and during his productive career produced at least two patents that involved gas sampling equipment.

== Health Physics Society ==
Tait was a key member in the formation of the Health Physics Society and represented Canada.

- Founding member and Director
- Representative from Canada

== Patents ==
- ANNULAR IMPACTOR SAMPLING DEVICE.
- Apparatus for discharging gases into the atmosphere.

== Publications ==
- The vertical temperature gradient in the lower atmosphere under daylight conditions.
- FLOWMETER ERROR IN MEASURING PULSATING FLOW.
- The Annular Impactor.
- Determining concentration of airborne plutonium dust.
- Reactor Siting, the Exclusion Area Concept and an Alternative Approach
- Radioactive Uniform Extended Sources.
- Emergency Radiation Monitoring of Drinking Water.
- Respirator problems in atomic energy practice.
- REACTOR EXCLUSION AREAS—CAN THEY BE ELIMINATED.
- Health and Safety in Canadian Operations .
- Effects of Radiation on Man: An International Experiment.
- The Integrating Impactor A Monitor for Airborne Alpha Emitters.
- Rise of Buoyant Gases Released from Intermittent Sources.
- A Simple Photographic Film Dosimeter of Low Energy Dependence.
- Cost-benefit analysis: Reality or illusion.
- Power to Our Grandchildren: The Future of Energy.
- CAN WE BUILD REACTORS IN BIG CITIES? THE UNDERLYING QUESTION IS...
