= Frank Bradley (organist) =

English organist (1853–1897)

Frank Henry Bradley (22 February 1853 – 1 November 1897) was an English organist.

== History ==
Bradley was born in Birmingham, Warwickshire, England, and developed an early love of music, particularly for the pipe organ after his father donated such an instrument to several churches in the city, and was consequently indulged in his passion. At age ten he took lessons from Andrew Deakin (Note: Deakin was organist and choirmaster of the Church of the Saviour 1847–1878, and musical critic of the Birmingham Daily Gazette.) and three years later succeeded S. Stratton as organist of St Barnabas Church, Edgbaston. (Note: It is likely Stratton was organist at St Barnabas before presiding at St Bartholomew's 1867–1875.) He was next apprenticed for five years to Dr Gaul of Norwich Cathedral. At age 20 he was appointed organist to the (Anglican) cathedral in Quebec. He left for New York, where he was organist to several churches including Trinity Church, Broadway, (Note: Perhaps Trinity Church (Elmira, New York)) and Plymouth Congregational Church, whose pastor was Henry Ward Beecher. He also gave concerts and lectures. He was, briefly, accompanist to Clara Louise Kellogg.

In 1876 he returned to England, where he was appointed organist to the Festival Choral Society and taught at Tottenhall College. He also had a teaching post in Birmingham. In 1877 he donated a Willis organ to the town's Masonic Hall, where he gave recital concerts. In 1878 he was selected by competition for appointment to St John the Evangelist, Belgravia, and also an academic position at Trinity College, London. He gave concerts in conjunction with exhibitions at Kensington. He played the grand organ at the reopening of Alexandra Palace theatre in 1885, and by which appointment he preferred to be known. In 1886 he suffered a breakdown in his health and was prescribed a "long sea voyage" by his physician, perhaps Sir Alfred Garrod.

Bradley arrived in Melbourne in 1887, and was soon in touch with the firm of George Fincham and Sons, whose Exhibition organ he appraised as "worthy colonial manufacture" but not in the same class as Willis, Hill and the like. He further suggested that the Town Hall organ (Hill & Son), the only one of note in Victoria, should be made available to more musicians, rather than being jealously guarded by the City organist, David Lee. He returned to England, but was soon contracted for a return season.

He was back in Australia in 1888, giving concerts in Melbourne, Sydney, Adelaide, New Zealand, and Hobart. He returned to England via Cape Town, where he gave another series of concerts. He played at the Centennial Exhibition and acted as resident organist at the Parish Church, Brighton, and St Stephen's church, Richmond.

He died in his native Birmingham, aged 45.

=== Other works ===
He wrote several compositions: anthems, organ pieces, and many pianoforte compositions.

He wrote four lectures on Bach organ works, dedicated to Frederick Cowen.
