= Edgar Charles Barnes =

Edgar Charles Barnes (6 April 1909 – 27 December 1987) was a pioneer in the field of industrial hygiene and the first industrial hygienist to work for a major U.S. corporation. He was also a founding member and director of the Health Physics Society.
