= C. Maurice Patterson =

Health physicist pioneer

- Born: December 24, 1913
- Died: May 21, 1989 (aged 75)
- Other names: Pat, Maurice Patterson
- Occupation: Health physicist
- Organizations: Health Physics Society
- Known for: Pioneer in the establishment of health physics as a profession
- Title: President of Health Physics Society (1962)
- Awards: Founders Award (1979); Fellow (1984); Diplomat, American Board of Health Physics

C. Maurice Patterson also known as Pat or Maurice Patterson (24 December 1913 – 21 May 1989) a pioneer in the establishment of health physics as a profession.

== Health Physics Society ==
Patterson was a key member in the formation of the Health Physics Society and represented the Savannah River Project.

- Founding member and Director
- Representative from Savannah River Project
- President, 1962
- Founders Award, 1979
- Fellow, 1984
- Diplomat, American Board of Health Physics

== Publications ==
- Patterson, C. M. (1958). Proceedings U. N. Intern. Conf. Peaceful Uses Atomic Energy, 2nd, Geneva, 23: 295.
- Monitoring of tritium in gases, liquids, and in the environment.
- Environmental Radiation at the Start
