= Walter Dunham Claus =

American biophysicist (1903–1995)

- Born: March 6, 1903; St. Louis, Missouri, U.S.
- Died: May 12, 1995 (aged 92); Golden, Colorado, U.S.
- Education: Washington University in St. Louis (PhD)
- Occupation: Biophysicist
- Parent(s): Ernest Claus; Laura Claus

Walter Dunham Claus (March 6, 1903 – May 12, 1995) was an American biophysicist who worked in radiobiology and medical physics.

== Early life and education ==
He was born in St. Louis, Missouri and died in Golden, Jefferson County, Colorado. Claus's father Ernest Claus was from Germany and his mother Laura Claus was from Missouri. In 1931 received his Ph.D. in physics from Washington University in St. Louis, for a doctoral thesis titled Effect of Temperature on the Diffuse Scattering of X-rays from Rock Salt. From 1931 through 1933, Claus continued to study X-ray effects as a National Research Council fellow. He then worked at the Mellon Institute and eventually joined the Atomic Energy Commission.

== Career ==
=== Atomic Energy Commission ===
In 1954, Claus oversaw the testing of samples from the Marshall Islands for radioactive fallout from the Castle Bravo explosion. From 1949-1955 he held the position of Chief in the Division of Biology and Medicine, AEC. Then from 1955-1967 he served as Special Assistant to Division Director, AEC.

=== Health Physics Society ===
Claus was a key member in the formation of the Health Physics Society and represented the U.S. Atomic Energy Commission. In 1955, he was one of the founding members and part of the initial board of directors. He would also serve as the society's president during 1961 and 1962.

== Publications ==
- Jee, Webster S. S. (1976). The Health Effects of Plutonium and Radium. J. W. Press. OCLC 1087470580.
- Jauncey, G. E.; Claus, W. D. (July 1928). "Interpretation of Atomic Structure Factor Curves in Crystal Reflection of X-Rays". Physical Review. 32 (1): 12–21. Bibcode:1928PhRv...32...12J. doi:10.1103/PhysRev.32.12.
- Hollaender, Alexander; Claus, Walter D. (20 May 1936). "The bactericidal effect of ultraviolet radiation on Escherichia coli in liquid suspensions". Journal of General Physiology. 19 (5): 753–765. doi:10.1085/jgp.19.5.753. PMC 2141463. PMID 19872959.
- Hollaender, Alexander; Claus, Walter Dunham (1937). An Experimental Study of the Problem of Mitogenetic Radiation. National research council of the National academy of sciences. OCLC 1378610917.
- Claus, W. D. (June 1958). "What is health physics". Health Physics. 1 (1): 56–61. Bibcode:1958HeaPh...1...56C. doi:10.1097/00004032-195801000-00009. PMID 13598290.
- Claus, Walter D., ed. (1958). Radiation Biology and Medicine: Selected Reviews in the Life Sciences. Addison-Wesley Publishing Company. ISBN 978-0-598-46217-6. OCLC 1151062539.
- Claus, W. D. (1962). "Symposium on education and training in health physics. Training programs in health physics". Hispalis Medica. 8: 93–95. doi:10.1097/00004032-196204000-00001. PMID 13879802.
