= Certified health physicist =

Certified Health Physicist is an official title granted by the American Board of Health Physics, the certification board for health physicists in the United States. A Certified Health Physicist is designated by the letters CHP or DABHP (Diplomate of the American Board of Health Physics) after his or her name.

A certification by the ABHP is not a license to practice and does not confer any legal qualification to practice health physics. However, the certification is well respected and indicates a high level of achievement by those who obtain it.

Certified Health Physicists are plenary or emeritus members of the American Academy of Health Physics (AAHP). In 2019, the AAHP web site listed over 1600 plenary and emeritus members.

== Professional responsibilities ==
A person certified as a health physicist has a responsibility to uphold the professional integrity associated with the certification to promote the practice and science of radiation safety. It is expected that such a person will always give health physics information based on the highest standards of science and professional ethics. A certified individual has a responsibility to remain professionally active in the health physics field and remain technically competent in the scientific, technical and regulatory developments in the field.

== General requirements required to receive the certification ==
The requirements for prospective candidates for certification are

1. Academics. At least a bachelor's degree from an accredited college or university in physical sciences, engineering, or in a biological science, with a minimum of 20 semester hours in physical science.
2. Experience. At least six years of professional experience in health physics. By permission of the Board, advanced degrees may substitute for one year (master's degree) or two years (doctorate) of the required experience.
3. References. A reference from the immediate supervisor and from at least two other individuals, including one from a currently certified Health Physicist.
4. Written Report. A written report that reflects a professional health physics effort.
5. Examination. A two-part exam, which is currently given during one week of the year.
  - Part I consists of 150 multiple choice questions in fundamental aspects of health physics. This portion of the test is three hours long, and can be taken without most of the above requirements. It is given at Pearson Vue testing centers throughout the world in the week before the Health Physics Society's annual meeting.
  - Part II consists of open-ended written questions, which determine competency in applied health physics. This portion of the exam is six hours long, and can only be taken after having passed Part I, or immediately after having taken Part I the week before. It is given on the Monday of the Health Physics Society's annual meeting, and on the same day at other locations throughout the country.
  - After passing Part I, the applicant must pass Part II within a period of seven years, or retake both parts.
  - If a candidate scores particularly poorly on Part II, he or she will be barred from taking it the following year.
  - Both parts include all of the topics below, but Part II requires candidates to answer only six mandatory questions and four of eight topic area questions.

=== Examination topics ===
- Atomic structure/Radioactivity/Radioactive decay
- Interaction of radiation with matter
- Internal dosimetry/Internal dose calculations
- Biological effects of ionizing radiation
- NRC, OSHA, Regulations/Standards ICRU, ICRP, NCRP
- Radiation Risk, BEIR III, IV, V, VI
- External dose calculations/External dosimetry
- Statistics
- Instrumentation
- Low Level Wastes, Fuel Cycle, DOT Regulations
- Shielding and Activation
- Air sampling/Modeling/Environmental Health Physics
- Medical Health Physics and X-ray Protection
- Reactor Health Physics/Criticality
- Accelerator Health Physics
- Lasers, UV, Microwave, RF
- Radon

=== Exam reference sources ===
Health Physics Topics

- Johnson, T.E. (2017). Introduction to health physics. Introduction to health physics.
- Johnson, T.E. & Birky, B.K. (1998). Health Physics and Radiological Health.
- Knoll, G.F. (1979). Radiation Detection and Measurement.
- Turner, J.E. (2007). Atoms, Radiation, and Radiation Protection.

Part I

- Bevelacqua, J.J. (1999). Basic Health Physics: Problems and Solutions.
- ABHP Part I Question and Solutions

Part II

- Bevelacqua, J. J. (2009). Contemporary health physics: Problems and Solutions.
- Turner, J.E. (1988). Problems and Solutions in Radiation Protection.
- American Board of Health Physics
- ABHP Part II Question and Solutions
