= Frederick P. Cowan =

Frederick P. Cowan was an American health physicist and head of the Instrumentation and Health Physics Department at Brookhaven National Laboratory.

Cowan grew up in the Boston, Massachusetts area. He attended Bowdoin College, then went on to Harvard University to complete his Ph.D. After Harvard, Cowan went on to Rensselaer Polytechnic Institute to teach. During World War II Dr. Cowan worked in radar countermeasures. This was followed by a stint at the Chrysler Corporation and finally he ended up at Brookhaven National Laboratory to lead the Health Physics Division.

== Selected publications ==
- Health Physics and Medical Aspects of a Strontium 90 Inhalation Incident
- Health Physics Program for the Brookhaven Cosmotron
- Radiation Safety in a Research Laboratory
- P32 Spill of April 23, 1957
- Bioassay Data and Analysis Relating to the P32 Spill of April 23, 1957
- A Preliminary Report on Health Physics Problems at the Brookhaven Alternating Gradient Synchrotron
- Personnel Dosimetry of Very-High Energy Radiations
- Some Dosimetry Problems of the Alternating Gradient Synchrotron (AGS)
- Health Physics Program for the Brookhaven National Laboratory Synchrotrons
- Health Physics Problems of High Energy Accelerators
- Everyday radiation
