= Roberts Rugh =

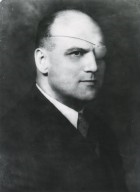
- Roberts Rugh, radiobiologist, embryologist
- Born: April 16, 1903; Springfield, Ohio, United States
- Died: November 11, 1978 (aged 75); Bethesda, Maryland
- Education: Oberlin College; A.B. 1926; Columbia University; M.A. 1927; Ph.D. 1935
- Spouse: Harriette Sheldon
- Children: Mary Elizabeth (Rugh) Downs; William Arthur.
- Scientific career
- Fields: radiobiology, embryology
- Workplaces: Lawrence College; Faculty 1927-1928; Hunter College; Instructor 1929-1939; New York University; Instructor 1939-1948; Columbia University; Professor of Radiology 1948-1971; Senior Medical Consultant and Lecturer 1971-1978

Roberts Rugh, Ph.D. (16 April 1903 – 11 November 1978), radiation biologist and embryologist.

== Life ==
Roberts Rugh was born to Arthur and Gertrude (Roberts) Rugh in Springfield, Ohio on April 16, 1903, and died on 11 November 1978 in Bethesda, Maryland. Rugh married Harriette Sheldon on July 24, 1926, and the couple had two children, Mary Elizabeth (Rugh) Downs and William Arthur.

== Education ==
Rugh earned his A.B. (1926) from Oberlin College and his M.A. (1927) and Ph.D. (1935) from Columbia University.

== Professional career ==
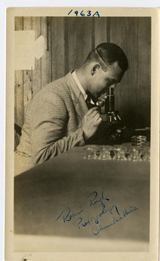
Roberts Rugh seated at a work table looking into a microscope. There are glass petri dishes in the foreground.

Roberts Rugh began his professional career as a faculty member at Lawrence College (1927-1928) and went on to teach at Hunter College (1929-1939) and New York University (1939-1948) before moving to Columbia University.

At Columbia, Rugh joined the Radiological Research Laboratory, College of Physicians and Surgeons. Here, he served as a Professor of Radiology (1948-1971) in addition to directing research on the effects of ionizing radiation (1948-1971) and serving as a senior medical consultant and lecturer (1971-1978). Rugh devoted many of his research pursuits in the field of embryology and published many papers and wrote several books on this topic.

== Selected publications involving radiation ==
- Rugh, Roberts. "Developmental Effects Resulting from Exposure to X-Rays: I. Effect on the Embryo of Irradiation of Frog Sperm." Proceedings of the American Philosophical Society. (1939): 447–471.
- Rugh, Roberts, and Frank Exner. "Developmental effects resulting from exposure to X-rays. II. Development of leopard frog eggs activated by bullfrog sperm." Proceedings of the American Philosophical Society. (1940): 607–619.
- Rugh, Roberts (1949). "Histological effects on the embryo following X‐irradiation." Journal of Morphology. (85)3: 483–501.
- Rugh, Roberts (1951). "The mouse thyroid and radioactive iodine (I131)." Journal of Morphology. (89)2: 323–365.
- Rugh, Roberts, and Joan Wolff. (1955). "Reparation of the fetal eye following radiation insult." AMA Archives of Ophthalmology. (54)3: 351–359.
- Rugh, Roberts, and Helen Clugston. (1956). "Protection of mouse fetus against X-irradiation death." Science. (123)3184: 28–29.
- Rugh, Roberts, and Sylvia Jackson. (1958). "Effect of fetal x‐irradiation upon the subsequent fertility of the offspring." Journal of Experimental Zoology. (138)2: 209–221.
- Rugh, Roberts (1958). "X-irradiation effects on the human fetus." The Journal of Pediatrics. (52)5: 531–538.
- Rugh, Roberts, and Erika Grupp. (1959). "Response of the very early mouse embryo to low levels of ionizing radiations." Journal of Experimental Zoology. (141)3: 571–587.
- Rugh, Roberts, and Erika Grupp. (1959). "Exencephalia Following X-Irradiation of the Pre-Implantation Mammallan Embryo." Journal of Neuropathology & Experimental Neurology. (18)3: 468–481.
- Rugh, Roberts, and Erika Grupp. (1960). "Fractionated x-irradiation of the mammalian embryo and congenital anomalies." The American Journal of Roentgenology, Radium Therapy, and Nuclear Medicine. (84): 125–144.
- Rugh, Roberts, and Marlis Wohlfromm. (1962). "Can the mammalian embryo be killed by X‐irradiation?." Journal of Experimental Zoology. (151)3): 227–243.
- Rugh, Roberts, et al. (1963). "X-rays: are there cyclic variations in radiosensitivity?." Science. (142)3588: 53–56.
- Rugh, Roberts. (1964). "Why radiobiology?." Radiology. (82)5: 917–920.
- Rugh, Roberts, et al. (1964). "Persistent stunting following x‐irradiation of the fetus." American Journal of Anatomy. (115)1: 185–197.
- Rugh, Roberts, et al. (1964). "Cataract development after embryonic and fetal x-irradiation." Radiation Research. (22)3: 519–534.
- Rugh, Roberts, and Marlis Wohlfromm. (1965). "Prenatal X-irradiation and postnatal mortality." Radiation Research. (26)4: 493–506.
- Rugh, Roberts (1965). "Effect of ionizing radiations, including radioisotopes, on the placenta and embryo." Birth Defects, Orig. Article Ser. 1.
- Rugh, Roberts, Marlis Wohlfromm, and Andre Varma. (1969). "Low-dose X-ray effects on the precleavage mammalian zygote." Radiation Research. (37)2: 401–414.
- Rugh, Roberts, et al. (1975). "Responses of the mouse to microwave radiation during estrous cycle and pregnancy." Radiation Research. (62)2: 225–241.

== Noted books ==
Rugh also wrote a number of books, including:

- The Frog: Its Reproduction and Development (1951)
- Experimental Embryology (1962)
- The Dynamics of Development (1964)
- The Mouse: Its Reproduction and Development (1967)
- A Laboratory Manual of Vertebrate Embryology (1971)
