= Robley D. Evans (physicist) =

American nuclear physicist (1907–1995)

Robley Evans
- Born: Robley Dunglison Evans; May 18, 1907; University Place, Nebraska
- Died: December 31, 1995 (aged 88); Paradise Valley, Arizona
- Scientific career
- Fields: Medical physics

Robley Dunglison Evans (May 18, 1907, University Place, Nebraska – December 31, 1995, Paradise Valley, Arizona) was an American nuclear physicist and pioneer of nuclear medicine. He was the president of the Health Physics Society in 1972–1973.

== Biography ==
His father Manley Jefferson Evans (1878–1970) and mother Alice Jennie Turner (1882–1965) married in August 1905 in O'Neill, Nebraska. Manley J. Evans was a professor at Nebraska Wesleyan University. Robley D. Evans was their only child. He is named in honor of Admiral Robley D. Evans, but there is no immediate family connection. In 1912 the family moved to Los Angeles County. Manley J. Evans taught at Hollywood High School for 32 years. At Hollywood High School, Robley D. Evans was the president of the science club and the valedictorian of the Class of 1925. In the 8th grade, even before he entered high school, he was playing percussion instruments professionally in danceable jazz bands. In high school he played in the regular band and sometimes in orchestra, symphony, and the Hollywood Bowl.

Evans studied physics at California Institute of Technology (Caltech) and graduated with a bachelor's degree in 1928, a master's degree in 1929. and a PhD in 1932. His thesis advisor was Robert Andrews Millikan. Evans's thesis concerned the measurement of "background radiation coming from the earth, so that it could be distinguished from cosmic radiation." He married his first wife, Gwendolyn Elizabeth Aldrich (1905–1989), in 1928. From 1932 to 1934 he was a National Research Council Fellow at the University of California, Berkeley.

== Career ==
He accepted a job offer at Massachusetts Institute of Technology (MIT) and he drove, with his wife Gwen, their first son Richard, and their adopted daughter Nadia, from California to Massachusetts in the summer of 1934. Robley Evans in 1934 taught MIT's (and the USA's) first course in nuclear physics. At MIT, he was an assistant professor from 1934 to 1938, an associate professor from 1938 to 1945, and a full professor from 1945 to 1972, when he retired as professor emeritus. In 1935 he established MIT's Radioactivity Center (a multidisciplinary endeavor) and directed it until his retirement in 1972. After retiring from the MIT faculty, he was a consultant at MIT and at the Mayo Clinic. He was the author or co-author of more than 200 scientific articles.

In the early 1930s he developed the meter-arc method (sometimes called the Evans method).

Evans was one of the world's first scientists to investigate radium's effects on human health. He did research on the radium exposure of former workers (called Radium Girls) who applied radioactive luminescent paint to clock faces and were instructed to form pointed tips on the paint brushes by applying moisture from their lips. He also did research on health problems caused by ill-advised use, in the 1920s, of radium in medicine, tonics, body adornment, or amusing novelty. The notorious case of Eben Byers, who died in March 1932, after taking over 1,000 doses of Radithor, received considerable publicity and alerted the general public to the dangers of radioactive substances.

In 1938 Evans instigated and chaired the Conference on Applied Nuclear Physics, which was held in October 1940 and was jointly sponsored by MIT and the American Institute of Physics. In 1938 he was the director for the construction of MIT's Markle Cyclotron, which became operational in 1939, and produced radioisotopes that were sent to dozens of medical research centers and companies. The cyclotron was operational for about 3 decades. The cyclotron's first product was iodine-130, which, with a half-life of 12 hours, was far more useful medicinally than iodine-128, which had a half-life of 25 minutes. For many years, physicians and researchers have used iodine-131, which has an even longer half-life of about 8 days.

In May 1941, Evans and the USA's other leading experts on the safe handling of radioactive materials held a one-day meeting at the National Bureau of Standards. He presented all of the data to the group of experts and suggested a maximum permissible body burden of 0.1 microcuries of radium. He individually asked each of the experts, including Gioacchino Failla, Leon Francis Curtiss (1985–1983), and Harrison Stanford Martland (1883–1954), for their opinions. All agreed with Evans's suggestion. Evans and Clark Goodman also established maximum permissible air concentrations for radon.

During WW II he worked with colleagues at MIT's Radioactivity Center and with physicians from the Medical Clinic of the Peter Bent Brigham Hospital and from Harvard Medical School to develop a technique for preserving human whole blood to benefit wounded military men.

In a January 1946 article published in The Atlantic Monthly, Evans summarized various medical applications of nuclear physics.

On his initiative, the Center for Human Radiobiology was established by the Atomic Energy Commission at Argonne National Laboratory to study the long-term effects of radium exposure.

Evans was also one of the most important pioneers of setting safety standards for the transportation of radioactive materials. From 1946 to 1969 he chaired a National Research Council committee on the transport of radioactive materials that created basic standards.

His doctoral students include Martin Deutsch.

Evans was elected a fellow of the American Physical Society in 1936 and of the American Academy of Arts and Sciences in 1945. He was also a fellow of the American Association for the Advancement of Science (AAAS), the New York Academy of Sciences, the American Association of Physics Teachers, and the American Nuclear Society. In 1990 he received the Enrico Fermi Award for "pioneering work in nuclear medicine, in measurements of body burdens of radioactivity and their effects on human health, and in the use of radioactive isotopes for medical purposes." He received the President's Certificate of Merit, the Theobald Smith Medal and Award in Medicine of the AAAS, the Hull Award and Gold Medal of the American Medical Association, the Silvanus Thompson Medal of the British Institute of Radiology, the Distinguished Achievement Award of the Health Physics Society, and the William D. Coolidge Award of the American Association of Physicists in Medicine in 1984.

Upon his death he was survived by his second wife and his three children from his first marriage.

The Columbia Chapter of the Health Physics Society (CCHPS) annually awards the Robley D. Evans Commemorative Medal.

== Selected publications ==
=== Articles ===
- Evans, Robley D. (1933). "Technique for the Determination of the Radioactive Content of Liquids". Review of Scientific Instruments. 4 (4): 216–222. Bibcode:1933RScI....4..216E. doi:10.1063/1.1749104.
- —— (1933). "Radium Poisoning a Review of Present Knowledge". American Journal of Public Health and the Nation's Health. 23 (10): 1017–1023. doi:10.2105/AJPH.23.10.1017-b. PMC 1558329. PMID 18013838.
- —— (1934). "The Measurement of Natural Alpha-Particles Ejected from Solids". Physical Review. 45 (1): 29–37. Bibcode:1934PhRv...45...29E. doi:10.1103/PhysRev.45.29.
- —— (1934). "Voltage Stabilizer Controlled by a Thermionic Pentode". Review of Scientific Instruments. 5 (10): 371–375. Bibcode:1934RScI....5..371E. doi:10.1063/1.1751750.
- ——; Raitt, Russell W. (1935). "The Radioactivity of the Earth's Crust and Its Influence on Cosmic-Ray Electroscope Observations Made Near Ground Level". Physical Review. 48 (3): 171–176. Bibcode:1935PhRv...48..171E. doi:10.1103/Physrev.48.171.
- Finney, Gladys D.; —— (1935). "The Radioactivity of Solids Determined by Alpha-Ray Counting". Physical Review. 48 (6): 503–511. Bibcode:1935PhRv...48..503F. doi:10.1103/PhysRev.48.503.
- —— (1935). "Apparatus for the Determination of Minute Quantities of Radium, Radon and Thoron in Solids, Liquids and Gases". Review of Scientific Instruments. 6 (4): 99–112. Bibcode:1935RScI....6...99E. doi:10.1063/1.1751952.
- Gingrich, N. S.; ——; Edgerton, Harold E. (1936). "A Direct-Reading Counting Rate Meter for Random Pulses". Review of Scientific Instruments. 7 (12): 450–456. Bibcode:1936RScI....7..450G. doi:10.1063/1.1752061.
- Schiff, L. I.; —— (1936). "Statistical Analysis of the Counting Rate Meter". Review of Scientific Instruments. 7 (12): 456–462. Bibcode:1936RScI....7..456S. doi:10.1063/1.1752062.
- Hertz, S.; Roberts, A.; —— (1938). "Radioactive Iodine as an Indicator in the Study of Thyroid Physiology". Experimental Biology and Medicine. 38 (4): 510–513. doi:10.3181/00379727-38-9915P. S2CID 96239997.
- ——; Goodman, C. (1941). "Radioactivity of rocks". Geological Society of America Bulletin. 52 (4): 459–490. Bibcode:1941GSAB...52..459E. doi:10.1130/GSAB-52-459.
- Goodman, C.; —— (1941). "Age measurements by radioactivity". Geological Society of America Bulletin. 52 (4): 491–544. Bibcode:1941GSAB...52..491G. doi:10.1130/GSAB-52-491.
- Root, Howard F.; Irvine Jr., J. W.; ——; Reiner, L.; Carpenter, Thorne N. (1944). "Absorption of Insulin Labeled with Radioactive Iodine in Human Diabetes". Journal of the American Medical Association. 124 (2): 84. doi:10.1001/jama.1944.02850020014005.
- ——; Goodman, Clark (1944). "Alpha-Helium Method for Determining Geological Ages". Physical Review. 65 (7–8): 216–227. Bibcode:1944PhRv...65..216E. doi:10.1103/PhysRev.65.216.
- Dunlap, C. E.; Aub, J. C.; ——; Harris, R. S. (1944). "Transplantable Osteogenic Sarcomas Induced in Rats by Feeding Radium". The American Journal of Pathology. 20 (1): 1–21. PMC 2033134. PMID 19970737.
- Keating, F. Raymond; Rawson, Rulon W.; Peacock, Wendell; —— (1945). "The Collection and Loss of Radioactive Iodine Compared with the Anatomic Changes Induced in the Thyroid of the Chick by the Injection of Thyrotropic Hormone1". Endocrinology. 36 (2): 137–148. doi:10.1210/endo-36-2-137.
- Chapman, Earle M.; —— (1946). "The Treatment of Hyperthyroidism with Radioactive Iodine". Journal of the American Medical Association. 131 (2): 86–91. doi:10.1001/jama.1946.02870190010003. PMID 21025610. (over 200 citations)
- Peacock, W. C.; ——; Irvine, J. W.; Good, W. M.; Kip, A. F.; Weiss, S.; Gibson, J. G. (1946). "The use of two radioactive isotopes of iron in tracer studies of erythrocytes" (PDF). The Journal of Clinical Investigation. 25 (4): 605–615. doi:10.1172/JCI101743. PMC 435599. PMID 16695353.
- Gibson, J. G.; Seligman, A. M.; Peacock, W. C.; Aub, J. C.; Fine, J.; —— (1946). "The distribution of red cells and plasma in large and minute vessels of the normal dog, determined by radioactive isotopes of iron and iodine. The Journal of clinical investigation" (PDF). 25 (6): 848–857.
- Gibson, J. G.; Sack, T.; ——; Peacock, W. C. (1947). "The effect of varying temperatures on the post-transfusion survival of whole blood during depot storage and after transportation by land and air" (PDF). The Journal of Clinical Investigation. 26 (4): 747–755. doi:10.1172/JCI101857. PMC 439283. PMID 16695466.
- —— (1948). Fundamentals of Radioactivity and Its Instrumentation. Advances in Biological and Medical Physics. Vol. 1. pp. 151–221. doi:10.1016/B978-1-4832-3109-9.50008-6. ISBN 9781483231099. PMID 18099972.
- Ahrens, L. H.; —— (1948). "The Radioactive Decay Constants of K^{40} as Determined from the Accumulation of Ca^{40} in Ancient Minerals". Physical Review. 74 (3): 279–286. Bibcode:1948PhRv...74..279A. doi:10.1103/PhysRev.74.279.
- ——; Evans, Richard O. (1948). "Studies of Self-Absorption in Gamma-Ray Sources". Reviews of Modern Physics. 20 (1): 305–326. Bibcode:1948RvMP...20..305E. doi:10.1103/RevModPhys.20.305.
- —— (1949). "Quantitative Inferences concerning the Genetic Effects of Radiation on Human Beings". Science. 109 (2830): 299–304. Bibcode:1949Sci...109..299E. doi:10.1126/science.109.2830.299. PMID 17782715.
- Davisson, Charlotte Meaker; —— (1951). "Measurements of Gamma-Ray Absorption Coefficients". Physical Review. 81 (3): 404–411. Bibcode:1951PhRv...81..404D. doi:10.1103/PhysRev.81.404.
- Aub, Joseph C.; ——; Hempelmann, Louis H.; Martland, Harrison S. (September 1952). "The Late Effects of Internally-Deposited Radioactive Materials in Man". Medicine. 31 (3): 221–329. doi:10.1097/00005792-195209000-00001. PMID 12982323. S2CID 7218731.
- Davisson, Charlotte Meaker; —— (1952). "Gamma-Ray Absorption Coefficients". Reviews of Modern Physics. 24 (2): 79–107. Bibcode:1952RvMP...24...79D. doi:10.1103/RevModPhys.24.79. 1952 (over 600 citations)
- —— (1958). "Compton Effect". Corpuscles and Radiation in Matter II / Korpuskeln und Strahlung in Materie II. Encyclopedia of Physics / Handbuch der Physik. Vol. 6 / 34. pp. 218–298. doi:10.1007/978-3-642-45898-9_6. ISBN 978-3-642-45900-9.
- Baker, W. H.; Bulkley, J. B.; Dudley, R. A.; ——; McCluskey, H. B.; Reeves, J. D.; Ryder, R. H.; Salter, L. P.; Shanahan, M. M. (1961). "Observations on the Late Effects of Internally Deposited Mixtures of Mesothorium and Radium in Twelve Dial Painters". New England Journal of Medicine. 265 (21): 1023–1028. doi:10.1056/NEJM196111232652101. PMID 13864173.
- Schroeder, Gerald L.; Kraner, Hobart W.; —— (1965). "Diffusion of radon in several naturally occurring soil types". Journal of Geophysical Research. 70 (2): 471–474. Bibcode:1965JGR....70..471S. doi:10.1029/JZ070i002p00471.
- Schroeder, Gerald L.; Kraner, Hobart W.; ——; Brydges, Thomas (1966). "Lithium-Drifted Germanium Detectors: Applications to Neutron-Activation Analysis". Science. 151 (3712): 815–817. Bibcode:1966Sci...151..815S. doi:10.1126/science.151.3712.815. PMID 17746722. S2CID 38698687.
- —— (1966). "The Effect of Skeletally Deposited Alpha-ray emitters in Man (Silvanus Thompson Memorial Lecture)". The British Journal of Radiology. 39 (468): 881–895. doi:10.1259/0007-1285-39-468-881. PMID 5225013.

=== Books ===
- The Atomic Nucleus. McGraw-Hill. 1955; xv+972 pp. (For more than 2 decades this book was a basic text for graduate students in nuclear physics.)
- You and Your Students. Massachusetts Institute of Technology. 1959; 60 pages; prepared by a faculty committee chaired by Robley D. Evans; illustrations by Henry B. Kane (This pamphlet is a practical manual on teaching and was translated into several languages. More than 100,000 copies have been sold.) reprint. 2018. ASIN B09SHHFJRZ.
