= Herbert Mermagen =

American physicist

Herbert Mermagen noted x-ray pioneer and medical physicist was born on 19 April 1907 and died at the age of 73 in Rochester, New York in January 1981.

== Select publications ==
- Evaluation of a rem responding neutron detector for use around the University of Rochester's 20 MeV Emperor Tandem Van De Graaff Accelerator
