= Health Physics Society =

US-based radiation safety organization

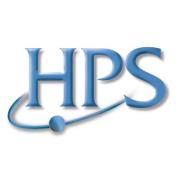
- Abbreviation: HPS
- Formation: 1955
- Region served: United States
- Members: 2,400
- Official language: English
- Affiliations: International Radiation Protection Association
- Website: http://hps.org/

The Health Physics Society (HPS) is a nonprofit scientific professional organization whose mission is excellence in the science and practice of radiation safety. It is based in the United States and the specific purposes of the society's activities include encouraging research in radiation science, developing standards, and disseminating radiation safety information. Society members are involved in understanding, evaluating, and controlling potential risks from radiation relative to the benefits.

The Society was formed in 1955, with an organizational meeting in June, 1955 at Ohio State University Columbus, Ohio. As of 2026, the membership consists of approximately 2,400 scientists, physicians, engineers, and other professionals. The headquarters are in Herdon, VA. The society is an affiliate of the American Institute of Physics.

== Activities ==
It publishes Health Physics since 1958, a peer-reviewed scientific journal; Health Physics News for material of interest to members, and Operational Radiation Safety. It operates a public information website, "Radiation Answers", and has begun a series of special publications (The first, Radiation and Risk: Expert Perspectives was published in March 2012.)

It holds its annual meeting in July, and a mid-year meeting in January or February.

The society's archives are held at the University of Tennessee, Knoxville.

== Organization ==
The society has 37 geographically based chapters, all in the United States, except for one chapter in the Georgian Republic and one in Taiwan; there are 8 Sections on special interests.

=== Awards ===
- Robley D. Evans Commemorative Medal
- Distinguished Scientific Achievement Award
- Elda E. Anderson Award
- Founders Award
- Fellow Award
- Distinguished Public Service Award
- Geoffrey G. Eichholz Outstanding Science Teacher Award
- National Student Science Award
- Health Physics Honor Roll
- G. William Morgan Lectureship Award
- Robert S. Landauer Sr., Lectureship Award
- Dade Moeller Lectureship Award

== Meetings ==
The first annual meeting was held in 1956 at the University of Michigan and these meetings have been held every year since in different US cities.

== History ==
A new national scientific organization for health physicists was founded at a 3-day health physics conference at Ohio State University on 14 June 1955. The organization was temporarily named "Health Physics Society", and Karl Z. Morgan of the Health Physics Division of Oak Ridge National Laboratory was elected interim president. Other interim officers were Frederick P. Cowan (vice president) and Elda E. Anderson (secretary-treasurer).

== Presidents of the Health Physics Society ==
- 1955 Karl Z. Morgan
- 1956 Karl Z. Morgan
- 1957 Frederick P. Cowan
- 1958 Lauriston S. Taylor
- 1959 Elda Emma Anderson
- 1960 John S. Laughlin
- 1961 Walter D. Claus
- 1962 C. Maurice Patterson
- 1963 William T. Ham, Jr.
- 1964 Howard L. Andrews
- 1965 Merril Eisenbud
- 1966 John R. Horan
- 1967 Walter S. Snyder
- 1968 Wright H. Langham
- 1969 J. Newell Stannard
- 1970 Claire C. Palmiter
- 1971 Dade W. Moeller
- 1972 Robley D. Evans
- 1973 Niel Wald
- 1974 James C. Hart
- 1975 Paul L. Ziemer
- 1976 John C. Villforth
- 1977 John A. Auxier
- 1978 Carl M. Unruh
- 1979 Melvin W. Carter
- 1980 William C. Reinig
- 1981 Charles B. Meinhold
- 1982 Roger J. Cloutier
- 2015 Nancy P. Kirner
- 2016 Robert Cherry
- 2017 Eric Abelquist
- 2018 Nolan E. Hertel
- 2019 Eric M. Goldin
- 2020 Eric M. Goldin
- 2021 John Cardarelli
- 2022 John Cardarelli
- 2023 Elizabeth Brackett
- 2024 Elizabeth Brackett
- 2025 Mike Lewandowski
- 2026 Mike Lewandowski
- 2027 Mike Mahathy

== See also ==
- American Academy of Health Physics, open only to those certified by the American Board of Health Physics.
- American Radium Society
- Radiation Research Society
