= Health physics =

Branch of physics focused on radiation protection

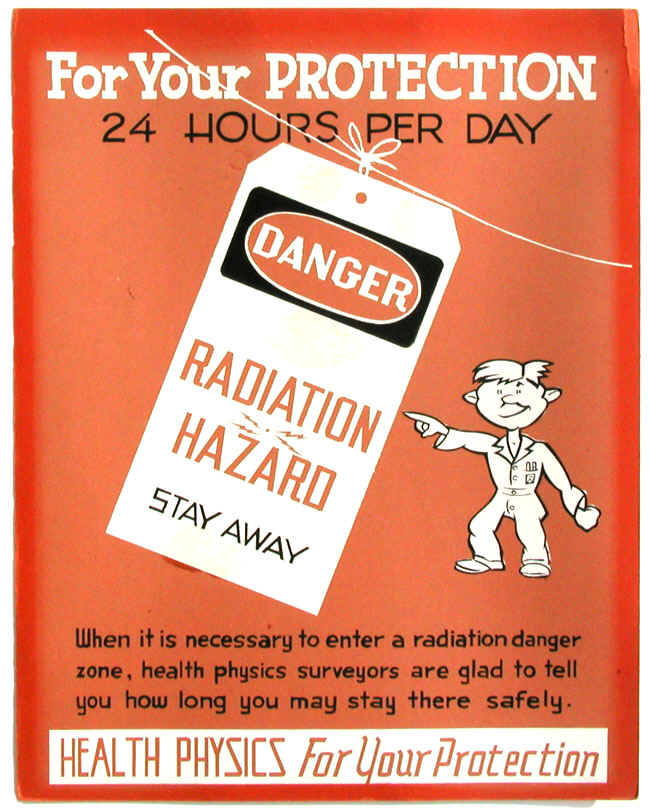
1947 Oak Ridge National Laboratory poster.

Health physics, also referred to as the science of radiation protection, is the profession devoted to protecting people and their environment from potential radiation hazards, while making it possible to enjoy the beneficial uses of radiation. Health physicists normally require a four-year bachelor’s degree and qualifying experience that demonstrates a professional knowledge of the theory and application of radiation protection principles and closely related sciences. Health physicists principally work at facilities where radionuclides or other sources of ionizing radiation (such as X-ray generators) are used or produced; these include research, industry, education, medical facilities, nuclear power, military, environmental protection, enforcement of government regulations, and decontamination and decommissioning—the combination of education and experience for health physicists depends on the specific field in which the health physicist is engaged.

== Sub-specialties ==
There are many sub-specialties in the field of health physics, including

- Ionising radiation instrumentation and measurement
- Internal dosimetry and external dosimetry
- Radioactive waste management
- Radioactive contamination, decontamination and decommissioning
- Radiological engineering (shielding, holdup, etc.)
- Environmental assessment, radiation monitoring and radon evaluation
- Operational radiation protection/health physics
- Particle accelerator physics
- Radiological emergency response/planning - (e.g., Nuclear Emergency Support Team)
- Industrial uses of radioactive material
- Medical health physics
- Public information and communication involving radioactive materials
- Biological effects/radiation biology
- Radiation standards
- Radiation risk analysis
- Nuclear power
- Radioactive materials and homeland security
- Radiation protection
- Nanotechnology

=== Operational health physics ===
The subfield of operational health physics, also called applied health physics in older sources, focuses on field work and the practical application of health physics knowledge to real-world situations, rather than basic research.

=== Medical physics ===
The field of Health Physics is related to the field of medical physics and they are similar to each other in that practitioners rely on much of the same fundamental science (i.e., radiation physics, biology, etc.) in both fields. Health physicists, however, focus on the evaluation and protection of human health from radiation, whereas medical health physicists and medical physicists support the use of radiation and other physics-based technologies by medical practitioners for the diagnosis and treatment of disease.

== Radiation protection instruments ==
Practical ionising radiation measurement is essential for health physics. It enables the evaluation of protection measures, and the assessment of the radiation dose likely, or actually received by individuals. The provision of such instruments is normally controlled by law. In the UK it is the Ionising Radiation Regulations 1999.

The measuring instruments for radiation protection are both "installed" (in a fixed position) and portable (hand-held or transportable).

=== Installed instruments ===
Installed instruments are fixed in positions which are known to be important in assessing the general radiation hazard in an area. Examples are installed "area" radiation monitors, Gamma interlock monitors, personnel exit monitors, and airborne contamination monitors.

The area monitor will measure the ambient radiation, usually X-Ray, Gamma or neutrons; these are radiations which can have significant radiation levels over a range in excess of tens of metres from their source, and thereby cover a wide area.

Interlock monitors are used in applications to prevent inadvertent exposure of workers to an excess dose by preventing personnel access to an area when a high radiation level is present.

Airborne contamination monitors measure the concentration of radioactive particles in the atmosphere to guard against radioactive particles being deposited in the lungs of personnel.

Personnel exit monitors are used to monitor workers who are exiting a "contamination controlled" or potentially contaminated area. These can be in the form of hand monitors, clothing frisk probes, or whole body monitors. These monitor the surface of the workers body and clothing to check if any radioactive contamination has been deposited. These generally measure alpha or beta or gamma, or combinations of these.

The UK National Physical Laboratory has published a good practice guide through its Ionising Radiation Metrology Forum concerning the provision of such equipment and the methodology of calculating the alarm levels to be used.

=== Portable instruments ===
Portable instruments are hand-held or transportable. The hand-held instrument is generally used as a survey meter to check an object or person in detail, or assess an area where no installed instrumentation exists. They can also be used for personnel exit monitoring or personnel contamination checks in the field. These generally measure alpha, beta or gamma, or combinations of these.

Transportable instruments are generally instruments that would have been permanently installed, but are temporarily placed in an area to provide continuous monitoring where it is likely there will be a hazard. Such instruments are often installed on trolleys to allow easy deployment, and are associated with temporary operational situations.

=== Instrument types ===
A number of commonly used detection instruments are listed below.

- ionization chambers
- proportional counters
- Geiger counters
- Semiconductor detectors
- Scintillation detectors

The links should be followed for a fuller description of each.

=== Guidance on use ===
In the United Kingdom the HSE has issued a user guidance note on selecting the correct radiation measurement instrument for the application concerned. This covers all ionising radiation instrument technologies, and is a useful comparative guide.

=== Radiation dosimeters ===
Dosimeters are devices worn by the user which measure the radiation dose that the user is receiving. Common types of wearable dosimeters for ionizing radiation include:

- Quartz fiber dosimeter
- Film badge dosimeter
- Thermoluminescent dosimeter
- Solid state (MOSFET or silicon diode) dosimeter

== Units of measure ==
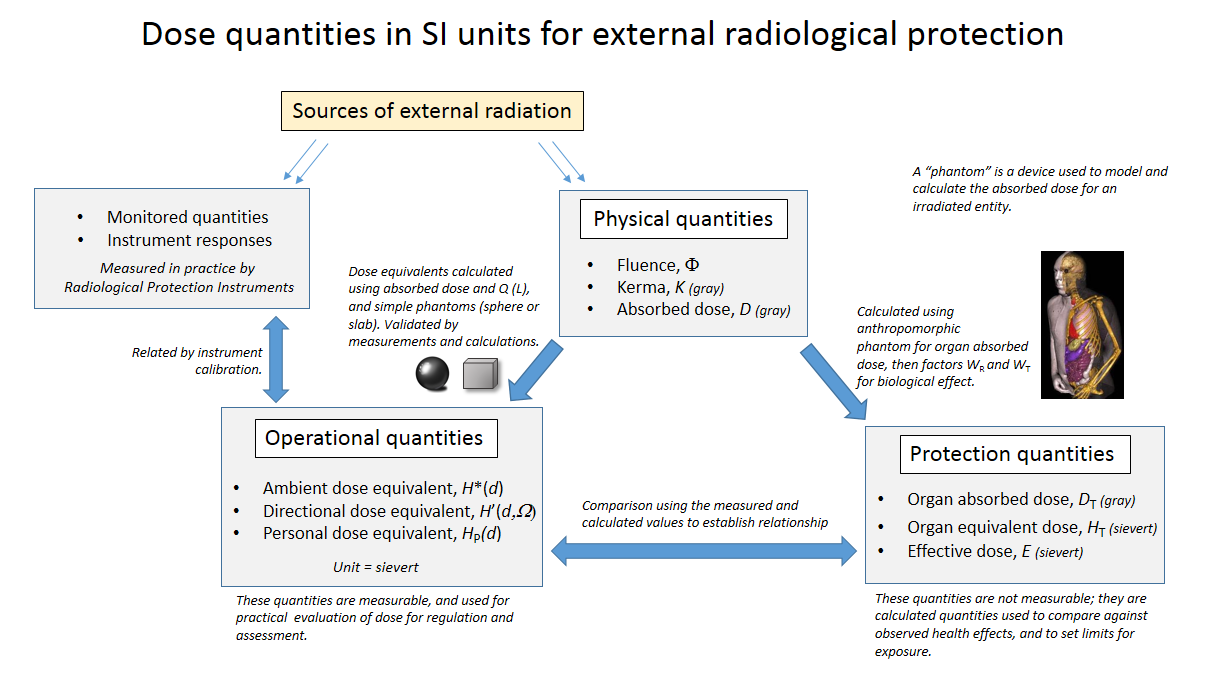
External dose quantities used in radiation protection and dosimetry

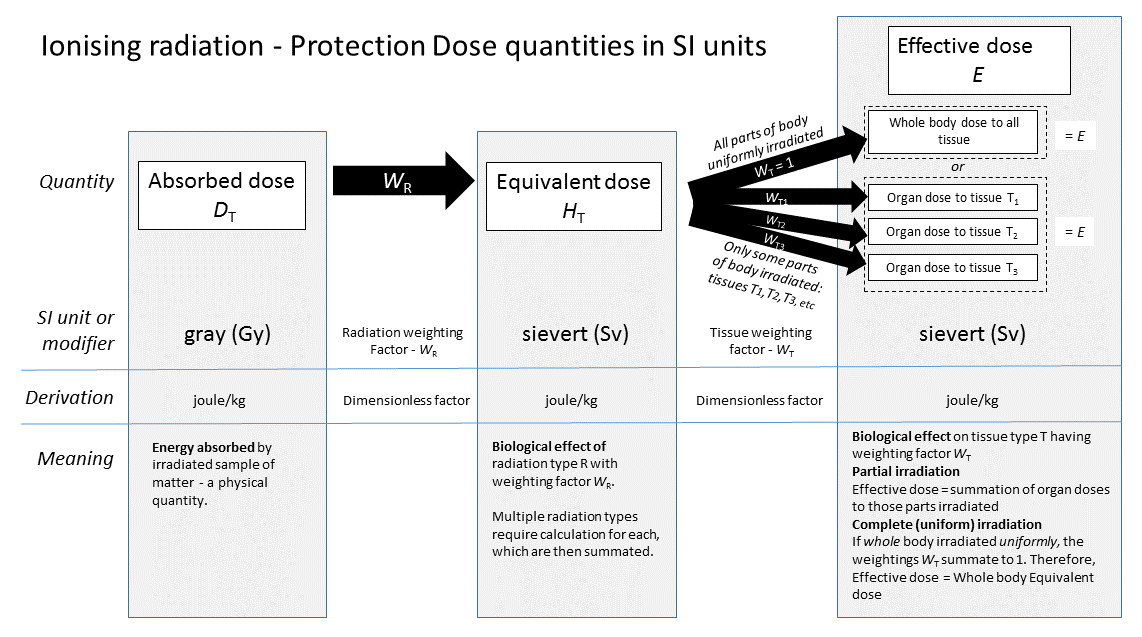
Graphic showing relationship of SI radiation dose units

=== Absorbed dose ===
The fundamental units do not take into account the amount of damage done to matter (especially living tissue) by ionizing radiation. This is more closely related to the amount of energy deposited rather than the charge. This is called the absorbed dose.

- The gray (Gy), with units J/kg, is the SI unit of absorbed dose, which represents the amount of radiation required to deposit 1 joule of energy in 1 kilogram of any kind of matter.
- The rad (radiation absorbed dose), is the corresponding traditional unit, which is 0.01 J deposited per kg. 100 rad = 1 Gy.

=== Equivalent dose ===
Equal doses of different types or energies of radiation cause different amounts of damage to living tissue. For example, 1 Gy of alpha radiation causes about 20 times as much damage as 1 Gy of X-rays. Therefore, the equivalent dose was defined to give an approximate measure of the biological effect of radiation. It is calculated by multiplying the absorbed dose by a weighting factor W_{R}, which is different for each type of radiation (see table at Relative biological effectiveness#Standardization). This weighting factor is also called the Q (quality factor), or RBE (relative biological effectiveness of the radiation).

- The sievert (Sv) is the SI unit of equivalent dose. Although it has the same units as the gray, J/kg, it measures something different. For a given type and dose of radiation(s) applied to a certain body part(s) of a certain organism, it measures the magnitude of an X-rays or gamma radiation dose applied to the whole body of the organism, such that the probabilities of the two scenarios to induce cancer is the same according to current statistics.
- The rem (Roentgen equivalent man) is the traditional unit of equivalent dose. 1 sievert = 100 rem. Because the rem is a relatively large unit, typical equivalent dose is measured in millirem (mrem), 10^{−3} rem, or in microsievert (μSv), 10^{−6} Sv. 1 mrem = 10 μSv.
- A unit sometimes used for low-level doses of radiation is the BRET (Background Radiation Equivalent Time). This is the number of days of an average person's background radiation exposure the dose is equivalent to. This unit is not standardized, and depends on the value used for the average background radiation dose. Using the 2000 UNSCEAR value (below), one BRET unit is equal to about 6.6 μSv.

For comparison, the average 'background' dose of natural radiation received by a person per day, based on 2000 UNSCEAR estimate, makes BRET 6.6 μSv (660 μrem). However local exposures vary, with the yearly average in the US being around 3.6 mSv (360 mrem), and in a small area in India as high as 30 mSv (3 rem). The lethal full-body dose of radiation for a human is around 4–5 Sv (400–500 rem).

== History ==
In 1898, The Röntgen Society (Currently the British Institute of Radiology) established a committee on X-ray injuries, thus initiating the discipline of radiation protection.

=== The term "health physics" ===
According to Paul Frame:

"The term Health Physics is believed to have originated in the Metallurgical Laboratory at the University of Chicago in 1942, but the exact origin is unknown. The term was possibly coined by Robert Stone or Arthur Compton, since Stone was the head of the Health Division and Arthur Compton was the head of the Metallurgical Laboratory. The first task of the Health Physics Section was to design shielding for reactor CP-1 that Enrico Fermi was constructing, so the original HPs were mostly physicists trying to solve health-related problems. The explanation given by Robert Stone was that '...the term Health Physics has been used on the Plutonium Project to define that field in which physical methods are used to determine the existence of hazards to the health of personnel.'

A variation was given by Raymond Finkle, a Health Division employee during this time frame. 'The coinage at first merely denoted the physics section of the Health Division... the name also served security: 'radiation protection' might arouse unwelcome interest; 'health physics' conveyed nothing.'"

== Radiation-related quantities ==
The following table shows radiation quantities in SI and non-SI units.

Ionizing radiation related quantities
Quantity	Unit	Symbol	Derivation	Year	SI equivalent
Activity (A)	becquerel	Bq	s^{−1}	1974	SI unit
Activity (A)	curie	Ci	3.7×10^{10} s^{−1}	1953	3.7×10^{10} Bq
Activity (A)	rutherford	Rd	10^{6} s^{−1}	1946	1000000 Bq
Exposure (X)	coulomb per kilogram	C/kg	C⋅kg^{−1} of air	1974	SI unit
Exposure (X)	röntgen	R	esu / 0.001293 g of air	1928	2.58×10^{−4} C/kg
Absorbed dose (D)	gray	Gy	J⋅kg^{−1}	1974	SI unit
Absorbed dose (D)	erg per gram	erg/g	erg⋅g^{−1}	1950	1.0×10^{−4} Gy
Absorbed dose (D)	rad	rad	100 erg⋅g^{−1}	1953	0.010 Gy
Equivalent dose (H)	sievert	Sv	J⋅kg^{−1} × W_{R}	1977	SI unit
Equivalent dose (H)	röntgen equivalent man	rem	100 erg⋅g^{−1} × W_{R}	1971	0.010 Sv
Effective dose (E)	sievert	Sv	J⋅kg^{−1} × W_{R} × W_{T}	1977	SI unit
Effective dose (E)	röntgen equivalent man	rem	100 erg⋅g^{−1} × W_{R} × W_{T}	1971	0.010 Sv

Although the United States Nuclear Regulatory Commission permits the use of the units curie, rad, and rem alongside SI units, the European Union European units of measurement directives required that their use for "public health ... purposes" be phased out by 31 December 1985.

== See also ==
- Health Physics Society
- Certified Health Physicist
- Radiological Protection of Patients
- Radiation protection
- Society for Radiological Protection The principal UK body concerned with promoting the science and practice of radiation protection. It is the UK national affiliated body to IRPA
- IRPA The International Radiation Protection Association. The International body concerned with promoting the science and practice of radiation protection.
