= Henry Harrington Janeway =

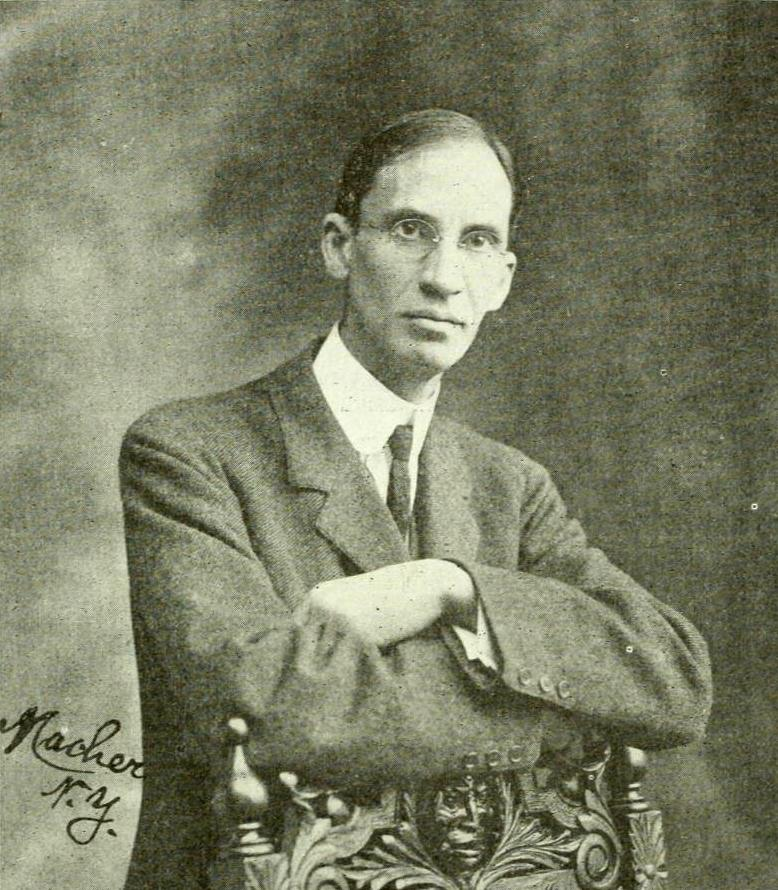
- Henry Harrington Janeway
- Born: 19 March 1873; New Brunswick, New Jersey
- Died: 1 February 1921 (aged 47); Riverdale-on-Hudson, New York
- Education: Rutgers Preparatory School; Rutgers College; Sheffield Scientific School, Yale University; College of Physicians and Surgeons, Columbia University
- Known for: Radium therapist
- Scientific career
- Fields: Physician, Radium therapist
- Workplaces: Roosevelt Hospital; College of Physicians and Surgeons, Columbia University; Memorial Hospital
- Doctoral advisor: Lucius Duncan Bulkley
- Other academic advisors: Russell Henry Chittenden; Charles McBurney

Henry Harrington Janeway (19 March 1873 – 1 February 1921) was an American physician and pioneer of radiation therapy.

== Publications ==
Janeway's clinical and experimental observations were published in medical journals of his time. His report on Radium Therapy in Cancer, at the Memorial Hospital (1915-1916), which appeared in book form in 1917 was the most comprehensive work of its type published in the United States. Its first chapter, "Physical Considerations Relative to the Application of Radium", was written by Gioacchino Failla. Janeway's 1919 paper on "The Treatment of Uterine Carcinoma" was considered a classic and was written while he was Attending Surgeon and Head of the Radium Department at Memorial Hospital in New York. His other papers, lectures, and books include:

- Janeway, H. H. (1909). A contribution to the knowledge of the early stages of epithelioma of the skin. Journal of Cancer Research and Clinical Oncology, 8(3), 403-435.
- JANEWAY, H. H., & GREEN, N. W. (1909). Experimental intrathoracic esophageal surgery. Journal of the American Medical Association, 53(24), 1975-1978.
- Janeway, H. H. (1909). II. The Serum Reaction in Cancer: Report from the Pathological Laboratory of the Skin and Cancer Hospital of New York City. Annals of surgery, 49(1), 27.
- Janeway, H. H., & Green, N. W. (1910). VII. Cancer of the Œsophagus and Cardia: A Description of an Operation for its Removal by the Transthoracic Route Under Conditions of Differential Pressure. Annals of surgery, 52(1), 67.
- Janeway, H. H. (1910). V. Autoplastic Transplantation of Bone. Annals of surgery, 52(2), 217.
- Green, N. W., & Janeway, H. H. (1910). VI. Artificial Respiration and Intrathoracic Œsophageal Surgery. Annals of surgery, 52(1), 58.
- Janeway, H. H., & Green, N. W. (1911). Esophagoscopy and gastroscopy. Surg., Gynec. & Obst, 13, 245.
- Janeway, H. H. (1911). XI. An Improved Device for Transfusion. Annals of surgery, 53(5), 720.
- Janeway, H. H. (1912). IX. An Apparatus for Intratracheal Insufflation. Annals of surgery, 56(2), 328.
- Janeway, H. H. (1913). Intra‐tracheal anesthesia from the standpoint of the nose, throat and oral surgeon with a description of a new instrument for catheterizing the trachea. The Laryngoscope, 23(11), 1082-1090
- Janeway, H. H. (1913). Intratracheal Anaesthesia: A. By Nitrous Oxide and Oxygen. B. By Nitrous Oxide and Oxygen Under Conditions of Differential Pressure. Annals of Surgery, 58(6 Suppl), 927.
- Janeway, H. H. (1913). THE RELATION OF GASTROSTOMY TO INOPERABLE CARCINOMA OF THE ESOPHAGUS: WITH A DESCRIPTION OF A NEW METHOD OF PERFORMING GASTROSTOMY. Journal of the American Medical Association, 61(2), 93-95.
- Janeway, H. H., & Ewing, E. M. (1914). The Nature of Shock: Its Relation to Acapnia and to Changes in the Circulation of the Blood and to Exhaustion of the Nerve Centres. Annals of surgery, 59(2), 158-175.
- JANEWAY, H. H. (1914). The Early Symptomatology of Cancer of the Esophagus. The American Journal of the Medical Sciences, 147(4), 583-588.
- Janeway, H. H. (1914). XIV. Simple and Complete Forms of Apparatus for Intratracheal Anæsthesia. Annals of surgery, 59(4), 628.
- Janeway, H. H. (1914). Results of radium in cancer. Journal of the American Medical Association, 62(22), 1707-1709.
- Janeway, H. H., & Jackson, H. C. (1915). The distribution of blood in shock. Experimental Biology and Medicine, 12(8), 193-197.
- Janeway, H. H. (1915). The influence of nocuous stimuli in the production of shock, and the failure of this influence to support the anoci theory of shock. Experimental Biology and Medicine, 12(4), 83-86.
- Janeway, H. H., Barringer, B. S., & Failla, G. (1915). Radium Therapy. Cancer at Memorial Hospital, 16.
- Janeway, H. H. (1918). The Treatment of Cancer of the Lip by Radium: A Report of Twenty-four Cases. Journal of the American Medical Association, 70(15), 1051-1058.
- Janeway, H. H. (1918). Treatment by radium of cancerous mucous membranes. Am. J. Roentg, 5, 414.
- Janeway, H. H. (1918). The treatment of tumors of the superior maxilla. Annals of surgery, 68(4), 353.
- Janeway, H. H. (1920). The therapeutic use of radium in diseases of the eye. Arch. Ophth, 49, 156-174.
- Janeway, H. H. (1920). The treatment of malignant tumors of the thymus gland by radium. Annals of surgery, 71(4), 460.
- Janeway, H. H. (1920). Treatment of cancer, particularly of the tongue, tonsil and rectum, by buried emanation. Am. J. Roentgenol, 7, 92.

== The Janeway Medal and Lectures ==
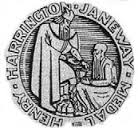
Janeway Medal (front)

In 1933, the American Radium Society founded the annual Janeway Lecture in his honor. The lecturers are chosen for their "outstanding scientific contributions" with the lecture taking place at the society's annual general meeting. The first Janeway Lecture, "Early Experience in Radium Therapy" was given by the pathologist James Ewing. Since 1937 each Janeway Lecturer is also presented with the Janeway Medal, originally struck in bronze but in 1971 changed to gold. The medal was designed by Edward H. Skinner, the American Radium Society's president-elect at the time, and Stephanie Prince, a young artist from Kansas City, Missouri. The design is based on Norse mythology and depicts Odin standing before the giant Mimir seeking to drink from the well of knowledge. The obverse depicts the ravens Hugin (Reflection) and Munin (Remembrance) which became the symbol of the American Radium Society.

=== Janeway Lectures ===
- 2023 Clifford A. Hudis, M.D., American Society of Clinical Oncology – "Progress & Professionalism".
- 2022 John R. Adler, Jr, M.D., Stanford University – "Sometimes an Entrepreneur, Always a Doctor".
- 2021 Lori Pierce, M.D., FASCO, FASTRO, University of Michigan – The Nexus of Quality Improvement and Equity of Care in Radiation Oncology: The Michigan CQI Model".
- 2020 Not awarded
- 2019 Michael Caligiuri, MD, City of Hope National Medical Center – "Human Natural Killer Cells: From Biology to Clinical Application".
- 2018 Michael Baumann, M.D., German Cancer Research Center – "Radiation Oncology in Times of Personalized Medicine".
- 2017 James P. Allison, M.D., University of Texas MD Anderson Cancer Center – "Immune Blockade in Cancer Therapy: New Insights and Opportunities".
- 2016 Jatin P. Shah, M.D., Memorial Sloan Kettering Cancer Center – “A Century of Progress in Head and Neck Cancer”.
- 2015 Jay R. Harris, M.D., Dana-Farber Cancer Institute – “50 Years of Progress in Radiation Therapy for Breast Cancer”.
- 2014 Murray F. Brennan, M.D., Memorial Sloan-Kettering Cancer Center – “The Evolution of Disease-Based Cancer Care”
- 2013 Mary Gospodarowicz, M.D., Toronto, Princess Margaret Hospital – "Cancer in the World – The Equity Imperative"
- 2012 David Larson, M.D., San Francisco, California – "The Fifth 'R' in Radiation Oncology"
- 2011 Larry Einhorn, M.D., Indiana University School of Medicine – "Testicular Cancer: A Model for a Curable Neoplasm"
- 2010 Charles M. Balch, M.D., Johns Hopkins Medical Institute – "Melanoma as an Example of Evidence-Based Medicine"
- 2009 Larry Kun, M.D., St. Jude Children’s Research Hospital – "Radiation Therapy- A Central Role in Pediatric Cancer"
- 2008 John Mendelsohn, M.D., University of Texas M.D. Anderson Cancer Center – "Targeting EGF Receptors: The Journey Continues"
- 2007 Harry Bartelink, M.D., Netherlands Cancer Institute – "Moving Towards a New Era in Radiotherapy"
- 2006 Andrew C. von Eschenbach, M.D., Bethesda, Maryland – "Progress with a Purpose: Eliminating the Suffering and Death Due to Cancer"
- 2005 Jean-Claude Horiot, M.D., Ph.D., Dijon-Bourgogne, France – "Radiation Oncologist, Endangered Species or Phoenix?"
- 2004 Samuel A. Wells, Jr., M.D., Durham, North Carolina – "The Multiple Endocrine Neoplasia"
- 2003 Carlos A. Perez, M.D., St. Louis, Missouri – "Past, Present Issues and Future Challenges and Opportunities"
- 2002 Richard Hoppe, M.D., Stanford, California – "Hodgkin’s Disease, a Model for Interdisciplinary Cancer Management"
- 2001 Jimmie C. Holland. M.D., New York, New York – "Improving the Human Side of Cancer Care"
- 2000 James D. Cox, M.D., FACR, Houston, Texas – "Clinical Science and Patient Care: Evidence in Oncology"
- 1999 Sarah S. Donaldson, M.D., Palo Alto, California – "Hodgkin’s Disease – Finding the Balance Between Cure and Late Effects"
- 1998 Hervy E. Averette, M.D., Miami, Florida – "Modern Therapy for Cancer of the Uterine Cervix"
- 1997 Robert G. Parker, M.D., Los Angeles, California – "Iatrogenic Carcinogenesis: Clinical Implications"
- 1996 Peter H. Wiernik, M.D., Bronx, New York – "What the Study of Leukemia has Taught Us about the Common Neoplasms"
- 1995 Lester J. Peters, M.D., East Melbourne, Australia – "Normal Tissue Tolerance Limits: For One or For All?"
- 1994 H. Rodney Withers, M.B., B.S., D.Sc., Los Angeles, California – "The Biology and Treatment of Subclinical Metastases"
- 1993 Theodore L. Phillips, M.D., San Francisco, California – "Radiation Effects on Normal Tissue – A Thirty-Year Perspective"
- 1992 Eric J. Hall, Sc.D., New York, New York – "Nine Decades of Radiobiology: Is Radiotherapy the Better for It?"
- 1991 Maurice Tubiana, M.D., Villejuif, France – "The Treatment of Thyroid Cancer by Ionizing Radiation: A Model for Metabolic Radiotherapy"
- 1990 Alfred G. Knudson, Jr., M.D., Ph.D., Philadelphia, Pennsylvania – "Hereditary Cancer and Tumor Suppressor Genes"
- 1989 Seymour H. Levitt, M.D., Minneapolis, Minnesota – "Role of Radiation Therapy in Hodgkin’s Disease: Experience and Controversy"
- 1988 Alfred S. Ketcham, M.D., Miami, Florida – "The Breast Surgeon’s Dilemma"
- 1987 Herman D. Suit, M.D., Boston, Massachusetts – "Scope of the Problem of Control of the Primary Tumor"
- 1986 John S. Laughlin, Ph.D., New York, New York – "Physical Aspects of Radiation Treatment: Some Developments and Implications for the Future"
- 1985 Eleanor Montague, M.D., Houston, Texas – "Radiation Therapy and Breast Cancer – Past, Present, and Future"
- 1984 Willet F. Whitmore, Jr., M.D., New York, New York – "Surgery and/or Irradiation: Some Areas of Confrontation in Urologic Oncology"
- 1983 Elliot W. Strong, M.D., New York, New York – "Multidisciplinary Management of Head and Neck Cancer: Update and Prospects"
- 1982 Felix N. Rutledge, M.D., Houston, Texas – "Gynecological Oncology – 1982-2002"
- 1981 Morton M. Kligerman, M.D., Philadelphia, Pennsylvania – "Pions, Protectors: Examples of a Vigorous Decade in Radiotherapy"
- 1980 Luther W. Brady, M.D., Philadelphia, Pennsylvania – "Malignant Tumors of the Eye"
- 1979 Oliver H. Beahrs, M.D., Rochester, Minnesota – "Treatment of Squamous Cell Epithelioma of the Anus"
- 1978 Frank J. Rauscher, Jr., Ph.D., New York, New York – The National Cancer Program: Progress and Problems"
- 1977 Henry S. Kaplan, M.D., Stanford, California – "Fundamental Mechanisms in Combined Modality Therapy of Cancer"
- 1976 Audrey Evans, M.D., Philadelphia, Pennsylvania – "Pediatric Cancer Treatment: A Model for Oncology"
- 1975 George C. Lewis, Jr., M.D., Philadelphia, Pennsylvania – "Ovarian Cancer: Multifacet Disease; Multifarious Therapy and Therapists"
- 1974 Milford D. Schulz, M.D., Boston, Massachusetts – "The Supervoltage Story"
- 1973 Juan A. del Regato, M.D., Colorado Springs, Colorado – "Total Body Irradiation in the Treatment of Chronic Lymphogenous Leukemia"
- 1972 Alfred Gelhorn, M.D., Philadelphia, Pennsylvania – "Cancer and Other National Problems"
- 1971 Lauren W. Ackerman, M.D., St. Louis, Missouri – "The Pathology of Radiation Effect on Normal and Neoplastic Tissue"
- 1970 Gilbert H. Fletcher, M.D., Houston, Texas – "The Cancer of the Uterine Cervix"
- 1969 Franz J. Buschke, M.D., San Francisco, California – "Radiotherapy – Past, Present, and Future"
- 1968 W. Gerald Cosbie, M.D., Toronto, Ontario, Canada – "Cancer Services – How Far Should It Go?"
- 1967 R. Lee Clark, M.D., Houston, Texas – "Systematic Cancer: Philosophy and Modalities of Treatment"
- 1966 Gordon P. McNeer, M.D., New York, New York – "The Problem of the Local Recurrence of Malignant Melanoma"
- 1965 T.A. Watson, M.D., London, Ontario, Canada – "Cancer of the Breast"
- 1964 Harold W. Dargeon, M.D., New York, New York – "Considerations in the Treatment of Reticuloendotheliosis"
- 1963 Axel N. Arneson, M.D., St. Louis, Missouri – "Long Term Observations in Endometrial Cancer"
- 1962 Virginia Kneeland Frantz, M.D., New York, New York – "Privileges and Challenges in the Study and Treatment of Thyroid Cancer"
- 1961 Clifford L. Ash, M.D., Toronto, Ontario, Canada – "Oral Cancer: A Twenty-five Year Study"
- 1960 William S. MacComb, M.D., Houston, Texas – "The Treatment of Head and Neck Cancer"
- 1959 James T. Case, M.D., Santa Barbara, California – "The Early History of Radium Therapy and the American Radium Society"
- 1958 Leonidas D. Marinelli, M.A., Lemont, Illinois – "Natural Radioactivity in the Human"
- 1957 Simeon T. Cantril, M.D., Seattle, Washington – "The Contributions of Biology to Radium Therapy"
- 1956 Lloyd F. Craver, M.D., New York, New York – "Reflections on Malignant Lymphomas"
- 1955 Herbert M. Parker, F.I.P., Richland, Washington – "The Radiological Sciences"
- 1954 Lauriston S. Taylor, Sc.D., Bethesda, Maryland – "Education in Radiation Protection"
- 1953 Leon O. Jacobson, M.D., Chicago, Illinois – "Factors Concerned in Recovery from Radiation Injury"
- 1952 Arthur Purdy Stout, M.D., New York, New York – "Intraepithelial Carcinoma of the Larynx"
- 1951 H. Dabney Kerr, M.D., Iowa City, Iowa – "Some Thoughts on the Training of a Radiation Therapist"
- 1950 Otto Glasser, Ph.D., Cleveland, Ohio – "Evolution of Radiological Physics as Applied to Isotopes"
- 1949 Charles L. Martin, M.D., Dallas, Texas – "Low Intensity Radium Element Needles"
- 1948 Sir Sanford Cade, London, England – "The Achievement of Radium in the Fight Against Cancer"
- 1947 Robert Spencer Stone, M.D., San Francisco, California – "Neutron Therapy and Specific Ionization"
- 1946 Frederick O’Brien, M.D., Boston, Massachusetts – "Radium Treatment of Cancer of the Cervix: A Historical Review"
- 1945 Not awarded
- 1944 Not awarded
- 1943 Not awarded
- 1942 William P. Healy, M.D., New York, New York – "The Role of the Gynecologist in the Field of Cancer"
- 1941 Edward H. Skinner, M.D., Kansas City, Missouri – "The Philosophy and Economics of Cancer"
- 1940 Edith Hinkley Quimby, Sc.D., New York, New York – "The Specification of Dosage in Radium Therapy"
- 1939 Gioacchino Failla, Sc.D., New York, New York – "Some Aspects of the Biological Action of Ionizing Radiation"
- 1938 Henry Schmitz, M.D., Chicago, Illinois – "Historical Retrospect of the Treatment of Carcinoma of the Uterus"
- 1937 Douglas Quick, M.D., New York, New York – "Carcinoma of the Larynx"
- 1936 Curtis F. Burnam, M.D., Baltimore, Maryland – "Early Experience with Radium"
- 1935 George E. Pfahler, M.D., Philadelphia, Pennsylvania – "The Protection of the Radiologist"
- 1934 Francis Carter Wood, M.D., New York, New York – "Recent Advances in Experimental Cancer Research"
- 1933 James Ewing, New York, New York – "Early Experience in Radium Therapy"
