= Edna Bruner =

Edna Bruner may refer to:

- Edna Bruner Bulkley (1883–1962), née Edna Bruner, an American missionary in Thailand
- Edna Baxter Bruner (1894–1978), an American violinist, pianist, and music educator
- Edna P. Bruner (1906–1997), a Canadian-American cleric and educational consultant
