= Brunero =

Brunero is a surname. Notable people with the surname include:

- Giovanni Brunero (1895–1934), Italian cyclist
- John Brunero, American philosopher
- Tim Brunero (born 1976), Australian Big Brother contestant and journalist

== See also ==
- Bruner
