= Francis Rudolph Shonka =

American physicist and inventor (1906–1970)

- Born: April 18, 1906; Linwood, Nebraska
- Died: October 11, 1970 (aged 64); Illinois
- Education: St. Procopius College; University of Chicago
- Known for: Shonka ionization chamber, Shonka electrometer, Shonka plastics
- Scientific career
- Fields: Physics, health physics
- Workplaces: St. Procopius College; Fu Jen University; St. Procopius College; DePaul University; Metallurgical Laboratory at the University of Chicago; St. Procopius College
- Thesis: New Evidence for the Existence of Penetrating Neutral Particles (1941)
- Doctoral advisor: Arthur H. Compton

Francis Rudolph Shonka (18 April 1906 – 11 October 1970) was a physicist and inventor. Shonka was known for his pioneering work with ionizing radiation measurement devices and equipment. This equipment bears his name today as the: Shonka ionization chamber, the Shonka electrometer, and Shonka plastics.

== Life and Times ==
In 1906, Francis R. Shonka was born at Linwood, Nebraska. He died in 1970.

== Education ==
In 1931, Shonka graduated from St. Procopius College at Lisle, Illinois with a B.S. degree in physics. He was offered and accepted the position of professor of physics at St. Procopius College and taught there for two years. He attended the University of Chicago during this time and graduated in 1933 with the M.S. degree in physics. Shonka was presented with the opportunity to teach in China, so he traveled to Peiping, China to become professor and head of the physics department at Fu Jen University for the following two years. After China, Shonka returned to St. Procopius College to again teach physics for an additional 2 years. Shonka accepted a position at DePaul University and taught physics for five years. Shonka attended the University of Chicago for doctoral studies and in 1941 was awarded a Ph.D. in physics. Arthur H. Compton was his advisor.

== Metallurgical Laboratory ==
Shonka went to the Metallurgical Laboratory at the University of Chicago and was promoted to director, instrument research and development division. In 1954, Shonka advance to become director of research, physical science laboratory at St. Procopius College, and remained in this position until he died in 1970.

== Patents ==
- Ionization chamber circuit, 1949.
- Electrical switch, 1955.
- Measuring device and apparatus, 1956.
- Method of encapsulating a magnet with polytetrafluoroethylene, 1961.
- Method of using and manufacturing plastic equivalent to organic materials, 1961.

== Dissertation ==
- New Evidence for the Existence of Penetrating Neutral Particles, 1941.

== Publications ==
- Shonka, Francis Rudolph. (1931). The Magnetic Field about a Straight Circular Solenoid.
- Eckart, Carl, & Shonka, F. R. (1938). Accidental coincidences in counter circuits. Physical Review. 53(9): 752.
- Shonka, F. R. (1939). New Evidence for the Existence of Penetrating Neutral Particles. Physical Review. 55(1): 24.
- Shonka, F. R., & Stephenson, R. J. (1944). Chicago Pressure Ionization Chamber for Gamma Ray Measurement. (No. AECD-2463;(MUC-RJS-2)).
- Shonka, F. R. (1946). Survey Instrument, Mark 1, Model 10, Zeuto.
- Shonka, F. R. (1946). Survey Instrument, Mark 1, Model 21-A, Zeus.
- Shonka, F. (January 1949). Health Protection Instrumentation. Nucleonics. 4(1): 44–45.
- Shonka, F. R. (1949). Instrument research and development division quarterly (No. ANL-4348).
- Shonka, T. (1950). White, Measurement of X-and Gamma Rays in Roentgens. Effects of Atomic Weapons.
- Shonka, F. R. (1952). INSTRUMENT RESEARCH AND DEVELOPMENT DIVISION QUARTERLY REPORT SEPTEMBER, OCTOBER, AND NOVEMBER, 1951. (No. ANL-4733). Argonne National Lab.
- Shonka, F. R. (1952). INSTRUMENT RESEARCH AND DEVELOPMENT DIVISION QUARTERLY REPORT FOR JUNE, JULY, AND AUGUST, 1952. (No. ANL-4885). Argonne National Lab.
- Shonka, F. R. (1953). INSTRUMENT RESEARCH AND DEVELOPMENT DIVISION QUARTERLY PROGRESS REPORT FOR JUNE, JULY AND AUGUST, 1953. (No. ANL-5118). Argonne National Lab.
- Shonka, F., & Rose, John E. (January 1957). A Conducting Plastic Tissue-Equivalent to Neutrons and Photons of Widely Different Energies. Radiation Research. 7(4): 464.
- Rossi, H., Shonka, F. R., & Sayeg, J. A. (1957). Operation TEAPOT. Nevada Test Site. February–May 1955. Project 39.7 (Part 2). Ionization Chamber Dose Measurements in Lead Hemispheres (No. AEC-WT-1228). Atomic Energy Commission. Washington, D.C.
- Shonka, F. R., Rose, John E., & Failla, G. (1958). Conducting plastic equivalent to tissue, air, and polystyrene (No. A/CONF. 15/P/753). Saint Procopius
- Shonka, F. R., Rose, J. E., & Failla, G. (1959). Progress in Nuclear Energy, Series XII. Health Physics. 160.
- Shonka, F. R. (1962). Vibrating Quartz Fiber Electrometer. Radiology. 78(1): 112.
- Kastner, Jacob, Rose, J. E., & Shonka, F. R. (1963). Muscle-equivalent environmental radiation meter of extreme sensitivity. Science. 140(3571): 1100–1101.
- Kastner, J., Shonka, F. R., & Rose, J. E. (1963). Construction and Performance of a Muscle-Equivalent Environmental Radiation Meter of Extreme Sensitivity. Radiology. 80(1): 122.
- Wyckoff, H., & Shonka, F. (January 1963). A Precision Cavity Chamber for Measurement of Intermediate Energy X-rays. Radiation Research. 19(1): 201.
- Shonka, F. R., Failla, G., & Rose, J. E. (1964). New electrometer of high sensitivity. Review of Scientific Instruments. 35(8): 1046–1049.
- Shonka, F. (1964). An analytical treatment of a circuit for ratio and difference of charges (Circuit for determining both ratio and difference of electric charge output of two ionization chambers).
- Shonka, F. R. (12 May 1964). ELECTROMETER UTILIZING AC AND DC VOLTAGE BALANCING (No. US 3133248).
- Shonka, F. R. (1965). An Analytical Treatment of a Circuit for Ratio and Difference of Charges. (No. TID-20736). Saint Procopius College. Lisle, Ill. Physical Sciences Lab.
- Kurityzky, C., Pfeiffer, W., Shonka, F., & Wyckoff, H. (1968). A miniature tissue-equivalent ionization chamber for pulse dosimetry.
- Shonka, F., Wyckoff, H., Kuritzky, C., & Williams. FS. (January 1968). New Techniques in Construction of Tissue Equivalent Ionization Chambers of Very Small Size. Physics in Medicine and Biology. 13(2): 296.
- Rose, J. E., & Shonka, F. R. (1968). Calculated Calibrations for Ion Chambers Fabricated from Plastics Simulating Air and Muscle; Determination of W and Γ_{Ra}. Radiation Research. 36(3): 384–395.
- Kuritzky, C. S., Shonka, F. R., Wyckoff, H. O., & Pfeiffer, W. F. (1968). A miniature tissue-equivalent ionization chamber for pulse dosimetry. (No. AFRRI-TN68-9). Armed Forces Radiobiology Research Institute. Bethesda, MD.
