= Pfahler =

Pfahler is a German language occupational surname for someone who erected stakes in vineyards and may refer to:

- Georg Karl Pfahler (1926–2002), German painter, printmaker and sculptor
- George E. Pfahler (1874–1957), American physician
- Kembra Pfahler (1961), American filmmaker, performance artist and visual artist
