= Leonidas D. Marinelli =

American radiologist (1906–1974)

Leonidas Donato Osvaldo Marinelli
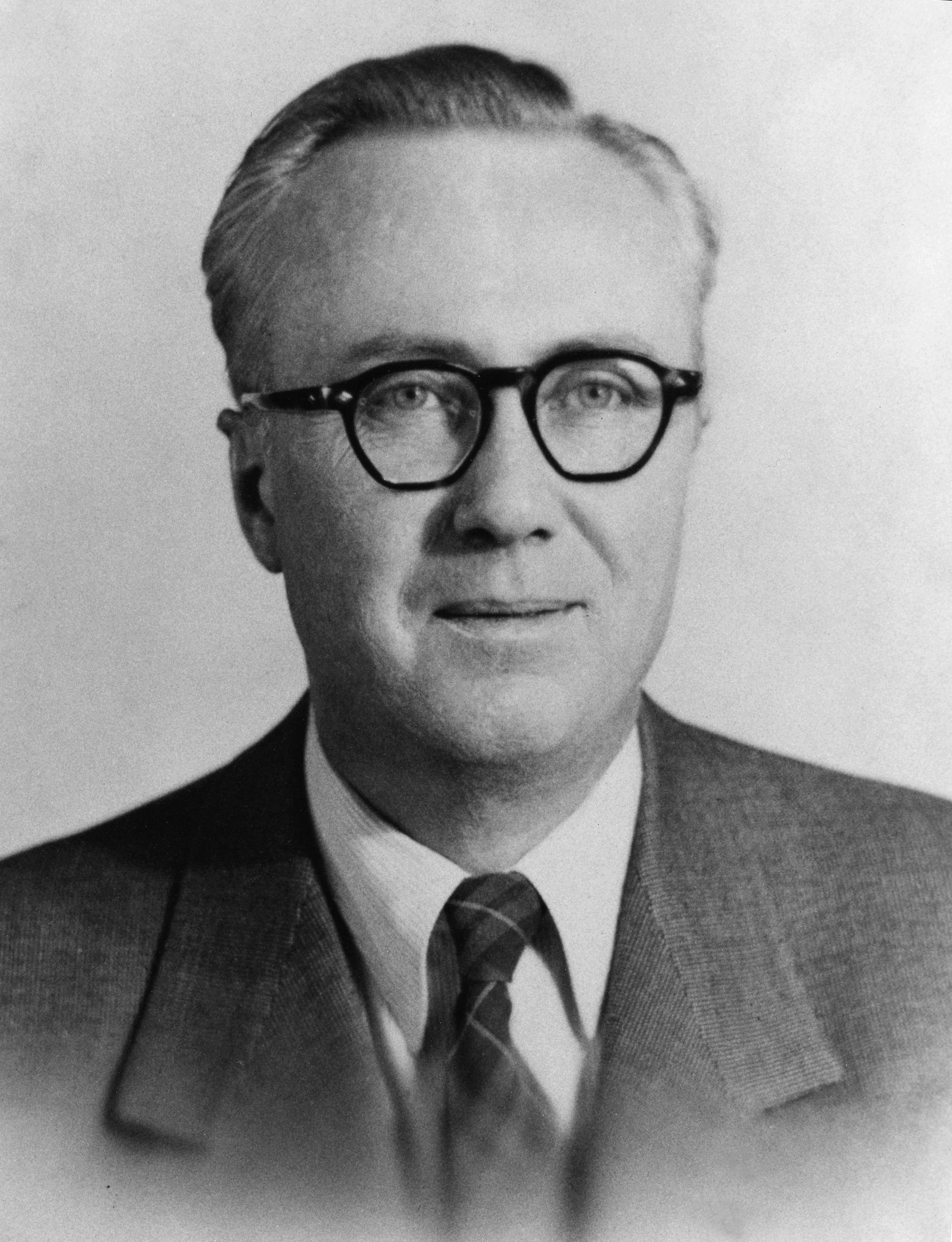
- Born: 28 November 1906; Buenos Aires, Argentina
- Died: 13 September 1974 (aged 67); Hinsdale, Illinois
- Education: Columbia University, Cooper Union
- Known for: Long-term effects of radium in humans, whole-body counting, Marinelli beaker
- Scientific career
- Fields: Cancer, radiation protection, human radiobiology, spectrometry
- Workplaces: Memorial Hospital; Known today as; Memorial Sloan Kettering Cancer Center; University of Chicago, Argonne National Laboratory
- Doctoral advisor: I. Rabi
- Other academic advisors: Gioacchino Failla

Leonidas D. Marinelli (28 November 1906 – 13 September 1974) was the American radiological physicist who is best known for founding the field of Human Radiobiology and developing the Marinelli beaker.

== Early life and education ==
Marinelli was born of Italian parents in Buenos Aires, Argentina, on November 28, 1906, eldest son of 6 children of bank owner Vincenzo Marinelli and Amelia Sammartino Marinelli. He was 11 when his father died of a heart attack. He then returned with his widowed mother and her children to the family seat in Agnone, Italy, where the Marinelli family established their bell foundry in the 12th century. Leonidas graduated from the Volta Institute of Naples in October, 1925, with highest honors and a gold Queen Victoria coin. Two months after his nineteenth birthday, he emigrated to New York City and worked as a meter tester while studying at Cooper Union Night School of Electrical Engineering. In 1929, he was hired by Dr. Gioacchino Failla, former student of Marie Curie, to the biophysical laboratory at Memorial Cancer Hospital, New York City, known today as Memorial Sloan Kettering Cancer Center). A few months later, Leonidas measured the gamma ray intensities of radium, previously unquantified, in electrostatic units which were convertible to the x-ray roentgen unit. This made possible the comparison of xrays and gamma rays, later useful to evaluations of cancer therapies. By 1933, he coauthored his first publication with Failla, Edith Quimby, and John E. Rose. In 1935, he became Assistant Physicist. In 1938, he completed all course requirements for the PhD at Columbia University and had published 5 papers in radiological journals.

== Career ==
Marinelli became an independent scientist in the 1940s. In 1941, he published papers that dealt with post-irradiation blood studies and early tracer work on cancer. In February, 1942, he published the theoretical basis for internal radiation dosimetry that provided the basis for nuclear medicine. In 1942, Marinelli established the principles for dosage determination of internal radioisotopes in the human body. In 1946, he developed the systematic dosimetry to distribute radioactive iodine to treat all locations of the metastases of a patient's thyroid cancer. This breakthrough was followed by autoradiography techniques and a Review of Modern Physics report on beta rays. The explosive growth of radiation medicine enlarged his responsibilities to the Head of Physics at Memorial-Sloan Kettering Institute.

In 1948, he added to his publication of internal radiation dosimetry the supplementary biological considerations contributed by Edith Quimby. In the same year, he moved to the Argonne National Laboratory, with a position on the University of Chicago faculty. Here, with John Rose, he provided early leadership and scientific direction of the Radiological Physics Division and the Biology and Medical Research Division. In 1950, he invented the Whole Body Counter that directly detected radioactive elements emitted from individuals who were previously contaminated in factories using radium, in nuclear industries, or by nuclear fallout. In 1953, he improved the "twin" scintillation low-level gamma-ray crystal spectrometry method to detect and locate elements that are naturally radioactive in the human body. These methods were quickly copied in laboratories throughout the world and yielded insights into the human metabolisms of many elements and their compounds. In 1956, he developed the twin scintillator method for dosimetry and spectrometry of fast neutrons, and its application to the measurement of cosmic-ray neutron background. Using this method, his investigations obtained the total content of natural potassium in the human body.

He authored review articles on dosimetry in the Annual Review of Nuclear Science, in Radiation Biology, and in the Dosimetry, Sonderdruck aus Handbuch der Medizinischen Radiologie. His studies of physics dealt with electron diffusion from point sources in air, and with the cosmic ray background. In radiology he pioneered the detection of minimal burdens of radioactivity in humans, studying their distribution and variation in tissues and the epidemiology of chronic low levels of radiation. The Center for Human Radiobiology, which now has the responsibility for all AEC-supported research on the effects of internally deposited radioisotopes, grew out of his effort.

== Inventions and patents ==
In 1950, Marinelli pioneered the Whole Body Counter, a low-level gamma-ray detector, and applied it to study the long-term effects of radium in people injected with radium in the 1920s and 1930s. The WBC used thallium-activated sodium iodide crystals. In radiology, he detected radium distribution and variation in tissues, and the epidemiology of chronic low levels of radiation

US Patent 2,795,703A - Isadore B. Berlman and Leonidas D. Marinelli, "Apparatus for counting fast neutrons in the presence of gamma rays", issued 1957, applied for 1954. Under military supervision, this patent was assigned to the Atomic Energy Commission.

Marinelli devised and applied the "twin" scintillator method for the dosimetry and spectrometry of fast neutrons to the measurement of cosmic neutron background. His spectrometric method was copied in many laboratories throughout the world and has yielded insights into the human metabolisms of many elements and their compounds.

=== Marinelli beaker ===
In 1943, Marinelli devised a beaker to analyze the radioactive liquids in the systematic dosimetry of radioactive iodine for metastasized thyroid cancer. The original version of the Marinelli beaker, consisted of a pyrex/glass laboratory beaker with a central hollow tube projecting from the bottom. A detector, usually a glass GM tube designed for gamma counting, was positioned in the central tube while the beaker was filled with the sample. Since the sample effectively surrounded the detector, the counting efficiency was greater than would be the case if the sample were in any other type of container.

The following footnote regarding the Marinelli beaker is found in a report by R.F. Hill, G.J. Hine and L.D. Marinelli (1950) of the Sloan-Kettering Institute in New York: "This equipment first designed by one of the present authors (L.D.M.) and in use in this laboratory since 1943, can now be obtained from Technical Associates, Inc. Glendale, California."

== Awards and honors ==
- Marinelli Road in Rockville, Maryland is named in his honor and the site for the US Nuclear Regulatory Commission headquarters office.
- 1958 Janeway Medal awarded by the American Radium Society. Janeway Lecture: Radioactivity in Man
- 1951 Radiological Society of North America: Certificate of Merit: Exhibit on Radium Toxicity
- 1952 American Academy of Orthopaedic Surgeons: Scientific Exhibit on Clinical Investigation of Radium Toxicity.
- 1964 Failla Memorial Lecture: New York Chapter of Health Physics Society
- 1978 Dedication of the International Symposium on "Biological Effects of Ra-224 and Thorotrast" to Leonidas D. Marinelli at Alta, Utah, July 21-23, 1974. (Health Physics Journal, July, 1978, Vol. 35, 5–6. Editor, Charles W. Mays. Pergamon Press, New York, 1978.)

== Research ==
- Research of Leonidas D. Marinelli from 1933 to 1974 click here https://leonidasdmarinelli.com/bibliography/ is recorded in the Open Literature Bibliography (August 1974). L.D. Marinelli research from 1964 to 1973 is recorded in NTIS (electronic files of the U.S. National Technical Information Service created in 1964) and include several abstracts. Research before 1964, except a few, is not included.
