= Beierwaltes =

Beierwaltes is a surname. Notable people with the surname include:

- Werner Beierwaltes (1931–2019), German academic
- William Henry Beierwaltes (c. 1917–2005), American physician
