= Sarah Donaldson =

American pediatric radiation oncologist

Sarah S. Donaldson (born 1939) is an American pediatric radiation oncologist and retired professor at Stanford University.

== Education ==
Donaldson was born in Portland, Oregon, on April 20, 1939, where she attended Grant High School and graduated in 1956. She completed a five-year degree in nursing at the University of Oregon in 1961, after which she worked for William S. Fletcher, a surgical oncologist, for several years as his assistant. Fletcher encouraged her to study medicine, and in 1968 she graduated from Harvard Medical School, after spending her pre-clinical years at Dartmouth Medical School.

== Career ==
Donaldson decided to pursue radiation oncology, a field to which she had some exposure when working with Fletcher, as his patients sometimes had neoadjuvant radiotherapy before he operated on them. She completed a residency in radiation oncology at the Stanford University School of Medicine in 1973. During that time, she was mentored by Henry Kaplan, and when she expressed an interest in pediatric radiation oncology, which was not yet an established specialty, Kaplan encouraged her to travel to France to complete a one-year fellowship at Institut Gustave Roussy. Upon her return to Stanford, she became an assistant professor in radiation therapy in 1973, later becoming a full professor in Stanford's Department of Radiation Oncology. She helped to establish a pediatric oncology program at Lucile Packard Children's Hospital, and she was the director of Stanford's residency program in radiation oncology from 2001 to 2009.

Donaldson has served as president of the American Society for Radiation Oncology (1991), the American Board of Radiology (1996), and the Radiological Society of North America (2012). She received the American College of Radiology's Gold Medal, the American Society for Radiation Oncology's Gold Medal, the Elizabeth Blackwell Medal, the American Radium Society's Janeway Medal, and the American Association for Women in Radiology's Marie Curie Award. She is an elected member of the National Academy of Medicine.

Donaldson and her partner, Jacob Haimson, jointly endowed the Jacob Haimson Professorship at Stanford, which later became the Jacob Haimson and Sarah S. Donaldson Professorship in recognition of both of their contributions to radiation oncology and medical physics. The current holder of that endowed chair is Dr. Lei Xing.

== Personal life ==
Donaldson lives with her long term partner Jacob Haimson, (born 25 February, 1928) a particle physicist from Melbourne, Australia. The pair has been together since 1976 and have no children.
