= Edna Bruner Bulkley =

American missionary

- Born: July 14, 1883; Sacramento, California, U.S.
- Died: March 25, 1962 (aged 78); Claremont, California, U.S.
- Other names: Ednah Bruner Bulkley
- Occupation(s): Educator, Presbyterian missionary
- Relatives: Lucius Duncan Bulkley (father-in-law); Henry Harrington Janeway (brother-in-law)

Edna Bruner Bulkley (July 14, 1883 – March 25, 1962) was an American missionary in Thailand (Siam) from 1903 to 1934.

== Early life ==
Bruner was born on July 14, 1873, in Sacramento, California, the daughter of Elwood Bruner and Lillian J. Flint Bruner. Her father was an attorney and a pastor.

== Career ==
Bruner became a Presbyterian teaching missionary in Siam in 1903, working at the Wang Lang Girls' School (Kullastri Wanglang) in Bangkok, with principal Edna Sarah Cole and other American women. After she married, she helped to establish a hospital in Trang. On furloughs in the United States in 1909–1910 and 1930, she spoke to church and women's groups about her work.

== Personal life and legacy ==
Bruner married medical missionary Lucius Constant Bulkley in 1911, in Thailand. His father was noted physician Lucius Duncan Bulkley, and his sister was married to another notable physician, Henry Harrington Janeway. They had seven children born between 1912 and 1924. Her husband died in 1949, and she died on March 25, 1962, at the age of 78, in Claremont, California. In 2003, her daughter Mary Bulkley Stanton published Siam Was Our Home, a memoir of the Bulkley family's time in Thailand. The school where Bruner taught in Bangkok was the precursor to the present-day Wattana Wittaya Girls Academy.
