= Brunner =

Brunner may refer to:

== Places ==
- Brunner, New Zealand, a town
- Brunner Borough, a borough on New Zealand's West Coast from 1887 to 1971
- Lake Brunner, New Zealand
- Brunner Mine, New Zealand
- Brunner, Houston, United States, an area in Houston
- Brunner (crater), lunar crater

== Other uses ==
- Brunner (surname)
- Elizabeth Irving, Lady Brunner (1904–2003), British actress and founder of the Keep Britain Tidy campaign
- Brunner baronets, a title in the Baronetage of the United Kingdom
- Brunner Investment Trust, a British investment trust
- Brunner the Bounty Hunter, a character from the Warhammer setting

== See also ==
- Brunner Professorships, three chairs at the University of Liverpool
- Brunner syndrome, a rare genetic disorder
- Brunner's glands, part of the digestive system
- Yul Brynner (1915–1985), Russian-born film and stage actor
- Brenner (disambiguation)
- Bruner, a surname
- Bruener (disambiguation)
