= Bruner =

Bruner is a surname. Notable people with the surname include:

- Al Bruner (1923–1987), cofounder of Global TV
- Bud Bruner (1907–1996), American boxing manager
- Carlton Bruner (born 1972), American swimmer
- Charles Hughes Bruner (born 1948), American politician from Iowa
- Charlotte H. Bruner (1917–1999), American academic and translator
- Cliff Bruner (1915–2000), American fiddler and band leader
- Edna Baxter Bruner (1894–1978), American violinist, music educator
- Edna P. Bruner (1906–1997), Canadian-American Universalist minister
- Elwood Bruner (1854–1915), American politician
- Ervin M. Bruner (1915–2008), American politician
- F. Dale Bruner (born 1932), American biblical scholar
- Jack Bruner (1924–2003), American baseball pitcher
- Jerome Bruner (1915–2016), American psychologist
- Jordan Bruner (born 1997), American professional basketball player
- Lawrence Bruner (1856–1937), American entomologist
- Mike Bruner (born 1956), American Olympic swimmer
- Peter Bruner (1845–1938), American ex-slave and memoirist
- Robert Bruner, business professor
- Ronald Bruner Jr., American drummer and composer
- Roy Bruner (1917–1986), American baseball pitcher
- Stephen Bruner a.k.a. Thundercat (born 1984), American bassist and singer
- Teel Bruner (born 1964), American football player
- Tommy Bruner (born 2001), American college basketball player
- Vince Bruner (born 1957), American politician from Florida
- Wally Bruner (1931–1997), American journalist and television host

== See also ==
- Brunner (disambiguation)
- Bruener (disambiguation)
- Brüner, see Bruener (disambiguation)
