= AMA Scientific Achievement Award =

The AMA Scientific Achievement Award is awarded by American Medical Association. It may be given to either physicians or non-physician scientists who have contributed significantly to the field of medical science. The award itself consists of a gold medallion.

The recipients are chosen by the AMA's Board of Trustees, and Physician candidates must be AMA members.

== Recipients ==
Source: AMA Awards

- 1962 – Donald D. Van Slyke, PhD, Upton, New York
- 1963 – John F. Enders, Phd, Boston, Massachusetts
- 1964 – René J. Dubos, PhD, New York, New York
- 1965 – Edward C. Kendall, PhD, Princeton, New Jersey
- 1966 – Wendell M. Stanley, PhD, Berkeley, California
- 1967 – Gregory Pincus, ScD, Shrewsbury, Massachusetts
- 1968 – Arthur Kornberg, MD, Palo Alto, California
- 1969 – Philip Handler, PhD, Durham, North Carolina
- 1970 – Choh Hao Li, Phd, Berkeley, California
- 1971 – Robert B. Woodward, MD, Cambridge, Massachusetts
- 1972 – William Bennett Kouwenhoven, MD, Baltimore, Maryland
- 1973 – Edith Hinkley Quimby, ScD, Palo Alto, California
- 1974 – Philip Abelson, PhD, Washington, District of Columbia
- 1975 – Rosalyn Yalow, PhD, Bronx, New York; Solomon A. Berson, MD (posthumously)
- 1976 – Harry Goldblatt, MD, Cleveland, Ohio
- 1977 – Helen B. Taussig, MD, Baltimore, Maryland
- 1978 – F. Mason Sones, MD, Cleveland, Ohio
- 1979 – Orvan W. Hess, MD, New Haven, Connecticut
- 1980 – Harold E. Kleinert, MD, Louisville, Kentucky
- 1981 – Hans von Leden, MD, Los Angeles, California
- 1982 – Willem J. Kolff, PhD, Salt Lake City, Utah
- 1983 – Maurice R. Hillerman, PhD, West Point, Pennsylvania
- 1984 – Maurice J. Jurkiewicz, MD, Atlanta, Georgia
- 1985 – Solomon H. Snyder, MD, Baltimore, Maryland
- 1986 – George Edward Burch, MD, New Orleans, Louisiana
- 1987 – Norman E. Shumway, MD, Stanford, California
- 1988 – Harriet P. Dustan, MD, Birmingham, Alabama
- 1989 – John G. Morrison, MD, Piedmont, California
- 1990 – Arthur C. Guyton, MD, Jackson, Mississippi
- 1991 – Henry Nicholas Wagner, Jr., MD, Baltimore, Maryland
- 1992 – Byrl J. "B.J." Kennedy, MD, Minneapolis, Minnesota
- 1993 – Juan A. del Regato, MD, Tampa, Florida
- 1994 – William H. Beierwaltes, MD, Grosse Point Park, Michigan
- 1995 – Carl R. Hartrampf, Jr., MD, Atlanta, Georgia; Frank G. Moody, MD, Houston, Texas
- 1996 – Alfred B. Swanson, MD, Grand Rapids, Michigan
- 1997 – E. Harvey Estes, MD, Raleigh, North Carolina
- 1998 – Charles S. Lieber, MD, Bronx, New York
- 1999 – no listed recipient
- 2000 – Tom Maniatis, MD, Cambridge, Massachusetts
- 2001 – Francis S. Collins, MD, PhD, Bethesda, Maryland
- 2002 – David Baltimore, PhD, Pasadena, California
- 2003–2009 – no listed recipients
- 2010 – David L. Chadwick, MD, La Mesa, California

== See also ==
- List of medicine awards
