= Henry Daggett Bulkley =

American physician (1803–1872)

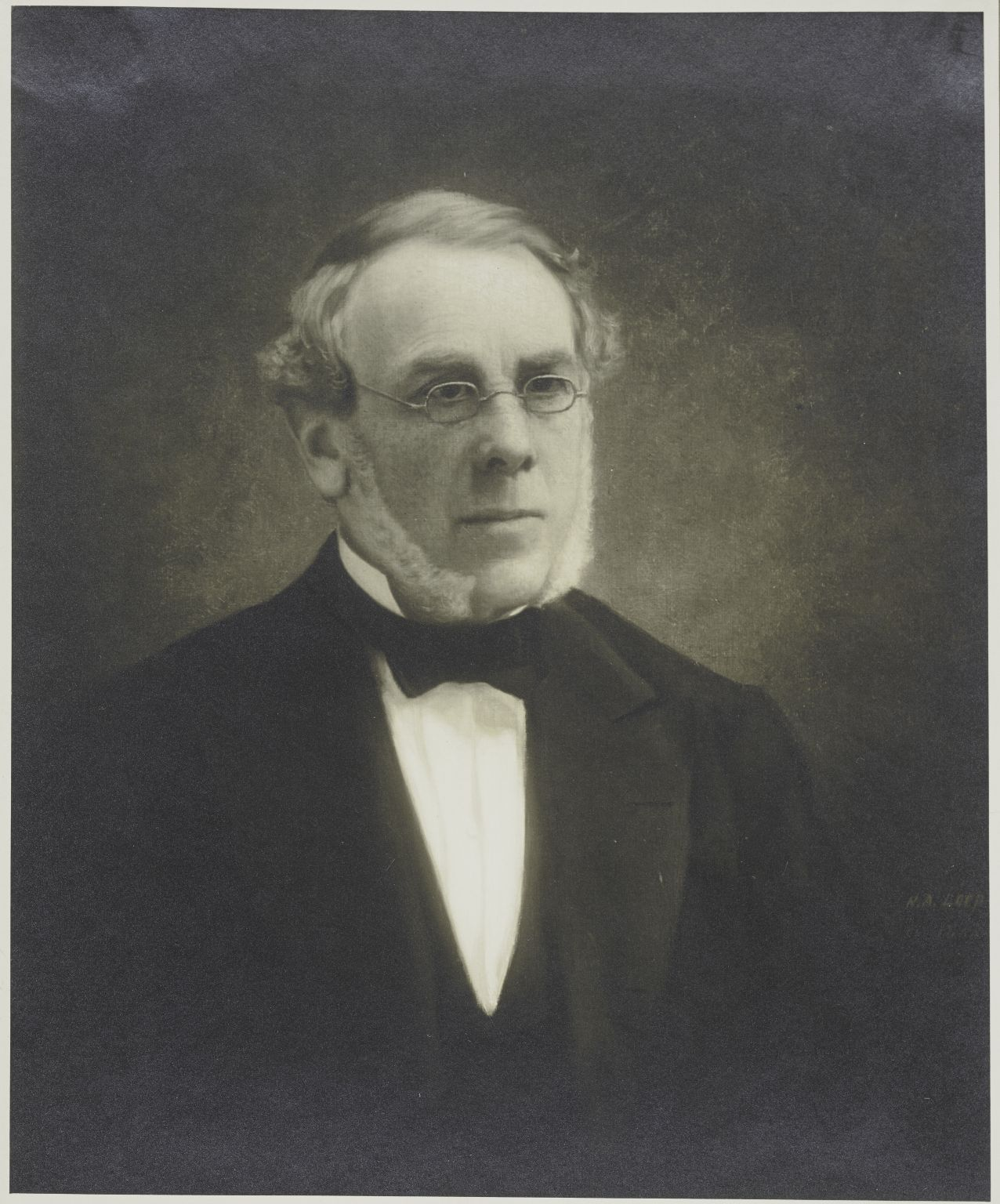
Henry Daggett Bulkley, portrait by Henry Augustus Loop

Henry Daggett Bulkley (April 20, 1803 – January 4, 1872) was an American medical doctor. He has been called a pioneer in American dermatology.

Bulkley, son of John and Amelia Bulkley, was born in New Haven, Connecticut, April 20, 1803. His mother was a daughter of Judge Henry Daggett, of New Haven. He graduated from Yale College in 1821. He was engaged in mercantile pursuits in New York City for six or seven years after graduation, and went to the Yale School of Medicine to study under Dr. Knight. He received the degree of M.D. in 1830, and soon after went to Europe for further advantages, and spent some time in the hospitals of Paris studying cutaneous diseases. He began practice in N. Y. City in November 1832, and remained in extensive practice until his death. He was especially an authority in cutaneous medicine, and one of the first in the country to lecture on these disorders, and the first to establish a dispensary in N. Y city for their treatment. Besides his connection with several other dispensaries, he was appointed in 1848 attending physician to the New York Hospital, which position he held until his death. He occupied at different times the presidential chairs of the New York Academy of Medicine, the New York County Medical Society, etc. In 1846 and in 1852, he published editions of Cazenave and Schedel on Diseases of the Skin, and in 1851 edited Gregory on Eruptive Fevers. Dr. Bulkley visited Europe for his health in June 1871, returnIng much benefited in October. He died of pneumonia at his residence in N. Y. City, January 4, 1872, after an illness of four days.

In 1835 he married Juliana, daughter of Wheeler Barnes, Esq, of Rome, N. Y. He had four daughters and two sons; his widow survived him, with two daughters, and both sons. His son Lucius Duncan Bulkley followed the profession of his father.
