= Margaret Ransone Murray =

Biologist (1901–1986)

Margaret Ransone Murray (November 16, 1901 – July 13, 1986) was an American scientist known primarily for her work on methods to establish cultures of neuronal cells. Her in vitro studies in cellular neurobiology shed light on both nerve- muscle relationships and axon myelination.

== Early life and education ==
Margaret R. Murray was born on November 16, 1901, at Riverlawn, her family home in Mathews, Virginia. She was the only child of Harriet Ransone and Archibald Campbell Murray. Her father's ancestor, Governor Sir George Chardley, arrived from England in 1609, having received 1100 acres in Mathews County Virginia. Margaret grew up in Baltimore, graduated from Western High School there and received a four year scholarship to Goucher College. She graduated as a member of Phi Beta Kappa in 1922. As an undergraduate, Margaret received a summer fellowship to Woods Hole Marine Biological Laboratory. She earned an M.S. degree from Washington University in St. Louis in 1924 in the laboratory of Caswell Grave and was inducted into Sigma Xi. Her master's thesis work was a study of the secretion of follicular cells of crickets In her thesis, she cites the influence of Margaret Reed Lewis for the formulation of cell culture media and development of tissue culture techniques. Murray then went to the Hull Zoological Laboratory at the University of Chicago to work with Charles Manning Child. She graduated Magna Cum Laude in 1928. Her Ph.D. thesis was titled "The Cultivation of Planarian Tissues in vitro". She remained in Manning's laboratory for another two years as a National Research Council Postdoctoral Fellow.

== Career and research ==
Murray's first position was as an associate professor at Florida State College for Women in Tallahassee. Her work attracted the attention of Arthur Purdy Stout, who invited her to Columbia University College of Physicians and Surgeons in New York to establish a research program in surgical pathology in 1931. The aim of the laboratory was to study the behavior of human tumors grown in vitro and to discover their cellular origins. She attained the rank of professor of anatomy at Columbia in 1959 and remained there until her retirement as professor emerita in 1970. Murray's laboratory focused primarily on the in vitro cultivation of neuronal cells, with a particular focus on nerve–muscle relationships and axon myelination .

The first 15 years of years of her career were devoted to the determination of the cellular origins of neoplasms. She postulated that the characteristics of the tumors grown in vitro could be used to diagnose tumor type. Murray and collaborators reported in 1940 that peripheral nerve sheath tumors originate from Schwann cells. In 1947, Drs. Murray and Stout described the distinctive characteristics of sympathetic tumors cultivated in vitro. Similar studies were carried out to diagnose neuroblastoma and rhabdomyosarcomas. They were also the first to demonstrate the growth characteristics of fat cells grown from a liposarcoma. Dr. Murray and colleagues also identified malignant fibrous histiocytoma as a distinct histopathologic entity in 1963. They defined malignant fibrous histiocytoma as a sarcoma composed of tissue histiocytes, which are embryonal forms of fibroblasts. Despite a recent trend toward abandoning the term "fibrous histiocytoma". Murray's original work provided a framework for understanding this tumor type. In summary, her initial publications were among the first clear demonstrations of the morphology of cancer cells in tissue culture.

She was one of the first to employ and compare the results of parallel in vivo and in vitro techniques to examine the effectiveness of chemotherapeutic agents on mouse gliomas and human glioblastomas.

Murray's major contribution was the development of tissue culture methods to study normal myelination and synaptogenesis in vitro. She devised an organotypic explant culture technique to study the long-term in vitro differentiation of explanted embryonic tissues from both the peripheral and central nervous systems using special culture chambers (the Maximov double coverslip assembly) and complex media containing embryo extracts and human placental serum.. This culture system allowed the interaction of different cell types for differentiation. Using this system, Murray and her long-term collaborator, Mrs. Edith Peterson, reported that myelination occurred in culture. Their in vitro studies demonstrated that Schwann cells spiraled their surface cell membrane in jelly roll fashion around the axon to form myelin . Her cine recordings of myelination and the development of Schmidt-Lantermann incisures to study Schwann cell myelination were instrumental to an understanding of nervous system development and damage Further work by Murray Bornstein and Murray examined the patterns of growth and myelin formation in normal cerebellum. In addition, she, Peterson and graduate student Stanley Crain reported that bioelectric activity could be maintained by nerve cells in vitro. Work by Murray and Mary Bartlett Bunge and Richard Bunge demonstrated the formation of synapses in cultures of developing spinal cord, using electron microscopy.

Murray's later work examined the functional differentiation of neuro-muscular junctions, to understand degenerative diseases of the nervous system. Further work examined the role of circulating demyelinating factors that contribute to neurological degeneration in multiple sclerosis and other diseases

Murray was widely recognized as an important mentor in the field of neurobiology. She mentored several generations of neurobiologists in techniques of organotypic cultures of neural tissues that included Dorothy Russell, Murray Bornstein, Richard Bunge and Mary Bartlett Bunge.

Murray retired from Columbia in 1970. She worked as a Senior Scientist at the National Institute of Neurological and Communicative Disorders and Stroke from 1973 to 1980.

Murray died July 13, 1986, near her home in Mathews, VA. She is buried in Williams Cemetery in Mathews, Virginia.

== Leadership roles and recognition ==
Murray was one of a group of 19 to found the Tissue Culture Commission ( subsequently the Tissue Culture Association (1950) and now the Society for In Vitro Biology) in 1946. The organization's goal was to promote the development of tissue culture techniques to solve problems in biology and medicine. The group was instrumental in devising standardized tissue culture techniques and developing commercial media and products for cell culture. She was first Secretary (1946-1950) and later President (1953-1959 ) of the group. She ran its annual course on the techniques, application and philosophy of tissue culture. As part of her work with this group, she and Gertrude Kopech created the first edition of the "Bibliography of Tissue Culture" which cited every reference in the field from its inception until 1950. In addition, Murray was the a founder of the American Society for Cell Biology in 1960.

Murray received many awards including a science citation from her alma mater Goucher College in 1954, an NIH Career Development Award 1962-1972, the University of Brussels science medal (1964), the National Multiple Sclerosis Golden Hope Chest Award (1964). Murray was a member of the research council of the National Multiple Sclerosis Society and a fellow of the N.Y. Academy of Science and the Japanese Tissue Culture Society (honorary member).

== Personal life ==
Murray married Burton LeDoux in 1941. He was a freelance writer from Canada and the first to expose the occupational dangers of coal dust and silica to the health of miners. He died of a stroke in 1979 at Margaret's ancestral home in Mathews.
