= Journal of Electroceramics =

- Discipline: Materials science
- Language: English
- Edited by: Harry L. Tuller

Publication details
- History: 1997-present
- Publisher: Springer Science+Business Media on behalf of The Minerals, Metals & Materials Society (United States)
- Frequency: 8/year
- Open access: Hybrid
- Impact factor: 1.785 (2020)

Standard abbreviations
- ISO 4: J. Electroceramics

Indexing
- CODEN: JOELFJ
- ISSN: 1385-3449 (print); 1573-8663 (web)
- LCCN: sn98038133
- OCLC no.: 177653710

Links
- Journal homepage; Online access

The Journal of Electroceramics is a peer-reviewed scientific journal that was established in 1997. It is published by Springer Science+Business Media on behalf of The Minerals, Metals & Materials Society. The editor-in-chief is Harry L. Tuller.

This journal covers research on electrical, optical, and magnetic ceramics, including silicon-electroceramic integration, nanotechnology, ceramic-polymer composites, grain boundary and defect engineering. Invited papers occasionally appear in the journal which provide information that encompasses significant progress and analysis of future trends in the various interdisciplinary sub-fields.

== Abstracting and indexing ==
The journal is abstracted and indexed in:

- Academic OneFile
- Chemical Abstracts Service
- ChemWeb
- Compendex
- Current Contents/Physical, Chemical and Earth Sciences
- Inspec
- Materials Science Citation Index
- PASCAL
- ProQuest
- Science Citation Index
- Scopus
- TOC Premier
- VINITI Database RAS

According to the Journal Citation Reports, the journal has a 2020 impact factor of 1.785.
