= Maruja Clavier =

Venezuelan oncologist

- Born: María Auxiliadora Clavier; 1934; Anzoátegui State, Venezuela
- Died: 2015 (aged 80–81); Venezuela
- Education: Central University of Venezuela
- Occupations: Phycian, nuclear medicine
- Known for: Dr. Raúl Vera Vera Oncology Unit

María Auxiliadora Clavier (1934 – 2015), also called Maruja Clavier, was an early Venezuelan nuclear oncologist. She was a founder of the Dr. Raúl Vera Vera Oncology Unit, a setting to provide care for local cancer patients.

== Biography ==
Maruja Clavier was born in 1934 in the Anzoátegui State located in the northeastern region of Venezuela. She began her baccalaureate education at the Colegio Nuestra Señora de La Consolación in Barcelona, Venezuela and completed it in Goshen, New York. Upon returning to Venezuela, she revalidated her work at the Liceo Fermín Toro. Later she enrolled at the School of Medicine of the University of Los Andes, and then transferred to the School of Medicine of the Central University of Venezuela, where she graduated as a physician in 1960.

Clavier's interest in the medicinal power of nuclear medicine was sparked when she translated from English into Spanish the book Physical Foundations of Radiology by Edith Quimby (et al.), who was one of the founders of this medical specialty. In 1963, Clavier graduated with the first class of radiation oncologists in the country, and the following year she founded the Eastern Chapter of the Society of Oncology in Barcelona, Venezuela. She served as its first president.

She helped create the Dr. Raúl Vera Vera Oncology Unit, one of the first to provide comprehensive care to cancer patients.

== Personal life ==
Clavier had five children. Two of her sons, Eduardo and Antonio Benavides, went on to pursue careers as Venezuelan oncologists.

== Translations ==
- Glasser, O.; Quimby, E. H.; Taylor, L. S.; Weatherwax, J. L. (1944), Physical Foundations of Radiology, New York: Hoeber

== Memberships ==
- Venezuelan Society of Oncology, President of the Eastern Chapter, 1964
- Venezuelan Mastology Society, Member of the Electoral Committee 2003-2005
