= Harold E. Kleinert =

American physician

Harold E. Kleinert (October 7, 1921 – September 26, 2013) was an American surgeon. As one of the hand surgeons at the University of Louisville in Kentucky, he and fellow surgeon Mort Kasdan performed the first revascularization of a partial digital amputation on November 12, 1962.

Born near Sunburst, Montana, Kleinert graduated from Temple University Medical School in 1946 and received its Distinguished Alumni Scientific Achievement Award in Surgery in 1987. His postgraduate training was completed at Grace Hospital in Detroit, Michigan. Kleinert founded the University of Louisville Hand Clinic in 1953 for comprehensive care of hand patients. In 1960, the Christine M. Kleinert Fellowship in Hand Surgery was established for those residents desiring postgraduate training and is the largest training program for hand surgeons in the United States.

Kleinert was Clinical Professor of Surgery Emeritus at the University of Louisville and at Indiana University-Purdue University, and served as President of the American Society for Surgery of the Hand in 1976. He was the recipient of the Scientific Achievement Award from the American Medical Association in 1980. Kleinert was appointed a National Consultant in Hand Surgery to the Surgeon General, United States Air Force in 1973. He has written more than 200 scientific publications.

In 1980, he received the AMA Scientific Achievement Award from the American Medical Association, for significant contributions to the field of medical science. The award itself consists of a gold medallion.

Kleinert died September 26, 2013.
