= Virginia Kneeland Frantz =

American pathologist

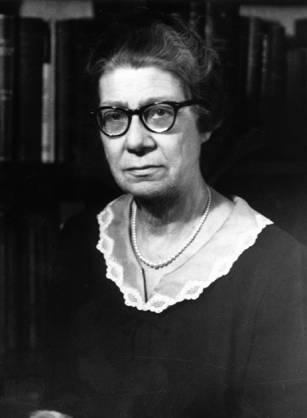
- Frantz in 1961
- Born: November 13, 1896; New York City
- Died: August 23, 1967 (aged 70)
- Education: Bryn Mawr College; Columbia College of Physicians and Surgeons
- Occupations: Pathologist, professor

Virginia Kneeland Frantz (November 13, 1896 – August 23, 1967) was a pathologist and educator credited with a series of discoveries in the study of thyroid, breast and pancreatic tumors.

== Early life and education ==
She was born in New York City, the daughter of Yale and Anna Ilsley Ball Kneeland. Frantz graduated from the Brearley School (1914) and Bryn Mawr College (1918). She then pursued medical studies at Columbia College of Physicians and Surgeons, graduating in 1922. In 1920, she married fellow student Angus Macdonald Frantz. They had three children.

== Career highlights ==
In 1922, New York Presbyterian Hospital, she became the first woman surgery intern. From 1924 to 1962 she taught surgery at Columbia University College of Physicians and Surgeons, becoming a full professor in 1951. In 1935, she and Allen O. Whipple described the insulin secretion of pancreatic tumors. In 1959, she wrote a study on tumors of the pancreas which became the standard text in the field. In 1961 she became the first female president of the American Thyroid Association.

== Awards and honors ==
- Army-Navy Certificate of Appreciation for Civilian Service, 1948
- Janeway Medal, 1962
- Columbia University, Bicentennial Silver Medal, 1967
- Student of Arthur Purdy Stout, noted alumnae of Brearley School, Columbia named award after her and presented to Rita Charon
- Virginia Kneeland Frantz Society

== Select publications ==
- Franz, V. K., Forsythe, R., Hanford, J. M., & Rogers, W. M. (1942). Lateral aberrant thyroid. Ann. Surg, 115, 161–183.
- Franz, M.D., Virginia Kneeland & Harvey, M.D., Harold Doric. (1946). Introduction to Surgery. New York and London: Geoffrey Cumberlege, Oxford University Press.
- Franz, V. (1959). Papillary tumors of the pancreas: benign or malignant. Frantz VK. Atlas of tumor pathology. Washington DC: US Armed Forces Institute of Pathology, 32–3.
