= Arthur Nowick =

American materials scientist

Arthur S. Nowick
- Born: August 29, 1923; Brooklyn, New York
- Died: July 20, 2010 (aged 86); Newport Beach, California
- Education: Columbia University
- Scientific career
- Fields: materials science
- Workplaces: Institute for the Study of Metals, University of Chicago, Yale University, IBM, Columbia University
- Thesis: Variation of amplitude-dependent internal friction in single crystals of copper with frequency and temperature (1950)
- Doctoral advisor: Shirley Leon Quimby
- Doctoral students: Harry Tuller

Arthur S. Nowick (August 29, 1923 – July 20, 2010) was an American materials scientist. He made pioneering contributions to the study of internal friction, anelasticity, crystal defects and other subjects over a fifty-year career and helped develop materials science from a field focused on metals to one that encompasses all classes of materials.

== Early career ==
Nowick was born in Brooklyn, New York, and received his BA degree in Physics in 1943 from Brooklyn College, and MA and PhD degrees in Physics from Columbia University in 1948 and 1950, respectively. During World War II he taught science and engineering in the Army Specialized Training Program at The Johns Hopkins University. He then moved to Cleveland, where between 1944 and 1946 he worked in a program sponsored by the National Advisory Committee for Aeronautics (the predecessor to NASA) to create materials that would withstand the heat required for developing jet engines

Nowick returned to New York after World War II, where he completed his doctoral work under S. L. Quimby at Columbia University, obtaining his PhD in 1949. He married Joan Franzblau in 1949, moved to Chicago, and became an instructor at the Institute for the Study of Metals and the University of Chicago. At Chicago he worked for under Clarence Zener, who became his mentor. In 1951, he joined Yale University as an assistant professor, and became associate professor there in 1954.

== Work at IBM and Columbia University ==
Nowick made his main contributions while working at IBM and Columbia University. In 1957, he took a position as a manager of metallurgy research at a new IBM Research Center in Yorktown, New York, where he worked until 1966. In this position, he began work on his book Anelastic Relaxation in Crystalline Solids with British scientist Brian Berry. Published in 1972, the book is considered the definitive work on the use of internal friction to study alloy phenomena. Together with Siegfried Mader, Nowick also developed 'vapor quenching', a technique for producing metastable alloys; the development spurred amorphous ferromagnetism as a field of scientific study. In 1996, he published a second book, "Crystal Properties via Group Theory."

== Later career ==
In 1966 Nowick returned to Columbia University as Professor of Metallurgy and Materials Science, where he remained until his retirement. Over course of his career he authored more than 200 publications and supervised over 30 PhD students, including MIT professor and materials scientist Harry L. Tuller. He retired from Columbia in 1994, and in 2001 Nowick and his wife moved to California, where he consulted at the University of California, Irvine. He died on 20 July 2010 of heart arrhythmia while swimming, at the age of 86.

The awards and honors conferred on Nowick over his fifty-year career include an Achievement Award from the American Society for Metals (1963), the A. Frank Golick Lectureship from the University of Missouri (1970) and the Zener Prize (1989). He was also the recipient of the David Turnbull Lectureship, which is bestowed by the Materials Research Society in recognition of career contributions to fundamental understanding of the science of materials.
