= Shirley Leon Quimby =

- Born: August 21, 1893; San Francisco
- Died: May 15, 1986 (aged 92); New York City
- Education: Columbia University
- Spouse: Edith Quimby
- Awards: Fellow of the APS (1931)
- Scientific career
- Fields: solid-state physics
- Thesis: On the experimental determination of the viscosity of vibrating solids (1925)
- Doctoral advisor: Albert Potter Wills
- Doctoral students: Jerrold R. Zacharias, William Fuller Brown, Don Kirkham, Arthur S. Nowick

Shirley Leon Quimby (August 21, 1893 – May 15, 1986) was an American physicist. He graduated from University of California at Berkeley in 1915 and received his PhD in physics at Columbia University in 1925. He served as a professor at Columbia from 1943 and became professor emeritus in 1962. In 1915 he married fellow student Edith Hinkley, who would later be noted for her contributions to nuclear medicine and radiology.

== Bibliography ==
- Nowick, A.; Havens Jr., W. W. (1986). "Shirley Leon Quimby". Physics Today. 39 (11): 119–121. Bibcode:1986PhT....39k.119N. doi:10.1063/1.2815223.
- "Dr. Shirley Leon Quimby". The New York Times. June 6, 1986.
