= Murray Bornstein =

American neuroscientist

Murray B. Bornstein (November 22, 1917 – August 31, 1995) was an American neuroscientist. He was well known for developing tissue culture techniques valuable for studying demyelinating disease. He was a student of Margaret Ransone Murray, who tuahgt him many of the cell culture techniques critical for his studies. He collaborated with the Weizmann Institute and Teva Pharmaceuticals to develop the drug Copaxone, now a common treatment for multiple sclerosis.

In 2014, the Geisel School of Medicine at Dartmouth College established a chaired professorship, relating to research specialty in neurology and multiple sclerosis, in his honor.
