= Bruener =

Bruener or Brüner may refer to:

== People ==
- Carson Bruener (born 2001), American football player, son of Mark Bruener
- Franz-Hermann Bruener, more commonly Franz-Hermann Brüner, German public official
- Mark Bruener (born 1972), American football player

== Places ==
- Bruener Marsh, misspelling of Breuner Marsh

== See also ==
- Bruner, a surname
- Brunner (disambiguation)
