= Harry L. Tuller =

American materials scientist

- Citizenship: United States
- Education: Columbia University
- Awards: Humboldt Research Award (1997)
- Scientific career
- Fields: Electroceramics
- Workplaces: Massachusetts Institute of Technology
- Doctoral advisor: Arthur Nowick

Harry L. Tuller is an American materials scientist. He is the R. P. Simmons Professor of Ceramics and Electronic Materials at the Massachusetts Institute of Technology.

== Biography ==
Tuller received his B.S. and M.S. in electrical engineering, and a Ph.D. in solid state engineering from Columbia University under Arthur Nowick. He did his postdoctoral research at Technion – Israel Institute of Technology and joined the MIT faculty in 1975. His research has focused on the defects, diffusion and electronic structure of metal oxides and their integration into sensors as well as the microelectromechanical effects in solar cells and fuel cells. He also co-founded Boston Systems, a company based on his invention of the micro-machining of silicon carbide.

Tuller received a Humboldt Research Award in 1997 to pursue investigations in nano-structured electro-ceramics at the Max Planck Institute for Solid State Research in Stuttgart. He received the Thomas Egleston Medal from the Columbia School of Engineering and Applied Science for his contributions to the field of electroceramics in 2019.

Tuller has been the founding editor-in-chief of the Journal of Electroceramics since 1997. He was elected a fellow of the Electrochemical Society in 2014 and a fellow of the American Ceramic Society in 1984 and a distinguished life member of the society in 2016.
