= Edith Quimby =

American medical researcher (1891-1982)

- Born: Edith Smaw Hinkley; July 10, 1891; Rockford, Illinois
- Died: October 11, 1982 (aged 91); New York City
- Spouse: Shirley Leon Quimby
- Scientific career
- Fields: Radiology

Edith Smaw Quimby (née Hinkley; July 10, 1891 – October 11, 1982) was an American medical researcher and physicist, best known as one of the founders of nuclear medicine. Her work involved developing diagnostic and therapeutic applications of X-rays. One of her main concerns was protecting both those handling the radioactive material and making sure that those being treated were given the lowest dose necessary.

== Early life and education ==
She was born on July 10, 1891, in Rockford, Illinois. In 1912, she graduated from Whitman College in Washington with a bachelor's degree in mathematics and physics. After a brief stint teaching high school in Nyssa, Oregon, she was awarded a 1914 fellowship for her master's degree studies at the University of California which she earned in 1916.

== Career and legacy ==
In 1919 she moved to New York City, where she took a job at the Memorial Hospital for Cancer and Allied Diseases as assistant physicist to Gioacchino Failla, which was very rare for a woman in her time; she became an associate physicist there in 1932.

Her working relationship with Failla continued for another forty years. In 1942, she left Memorial Hospital and joined the Center for Radiological Research, led by Failla, at Columbia's medical school, where she worked until 1978. Her research at Memorial Hospital delved into safe doses of medicinal radiation, observing the energy emitted by potential materials for nuclear medicine as well as the amount of radiation absorbed by the body from different sources. She also studied the potential of synthesised radioactive materials for treating cancer and in other medical research applications.

In 1941, she was appointed to the faculty of Cornell University Medical College as an assistant professor of radiology. The next year, she became an associate professor of radiation physics at the College of Physicians and Surgeons at In Columbia University. She was promoted to full professor in 1954 and retired in 1960.

Quimby received many awards for her work throughout her career and participated in several scientific societies. In 1940, she was the first woman to receive the Janeway Medal from American Radium Society. The following year, she was awarded the Gold Medal of the Radiological Society of North America, for work which "placed every radiologist in her debt." She was elected president of the American Radium Society in 1954. In 1963, the American College of Radiology honoured her with its gold medal. She was one of the first members of the American Association of Physicists in Medicine. The American Association of Physicists in Medicine established a lifetime achievement award in her honor.

== Research ==
In 1962 she released a paper titled "Late Radiation Effects in Roentgen Therapy for Hyperthyroidism" where she suggested ceasing all Roentgen therapy (radiation therapy) until we had a better idea of how this kind of treatment affected patients in the long term.

== Personal life ==
She was one of three children of Arthur S. Hinkley, a farmer and architect, and Harriet Hinkley. She married Shirley Leon Quimby in 1915.

== Publications ==
- Quimby, E.H.; Werner, S.C. (1949), "Late radiation effects in Roentgen therapy for hyperthyroidism", JAMA, 140 (12): 1046–1047, doi:10.1001/jama.1949.02900470050018
- Glasser, O.; Quimby, E. H.; Taylor, L. S.; Weatherwax, J. L. (1944), Physical Foundations of Radiology, New York: Hoeber (translated into Spanish by oncologist Maruja Clavier)
