= Don Kirkham =

American soil scientist (1908–1998)

- Born: February 11, 1908; Provo, Utah
- Died: March 7, 1998 (aged 90); Ames, Iowa
- Education: Columbia University
- Spouse: Mary Elizabeth (Betty) Erwin Kirkham
- Awards: Wolf Prize in Agriculture (1983/4), Robert E. Horton Medal (1995)
- Scientific career
- Fields: soil science
- Workplaces: Utah State University, Iowa State University
- Thesis: The variation of the initial susceptibility with temperature and the variation of the magnetostriction and reversible susceptibility with temperature and magnetization in nickel (1938)
- Doctoral advisor: Shirley Leon Quimby

Don Kirkham (February 11, 1908 – March 7, 1998) was an American soil scientist regarded as the founder of mathematical soil physics. His special interest was the flow of water through soils and drainage of agricultural land. He was awarded the 1983/4 Wolf Prize in Agriculture and the Robert E. Horton Medal in 1995.

== Selected publications ==
- Kirkham, D.; Powers, William L. (1972). Advanced soil physics. New York: Wiley Interscience. ISBN 0-471-48875-5.
