= Orvan Hess =

20th-century American physician; inventor of the fetal heart monitor

Orvan Walter Hess
- Born: June 18, 1906; Baoba, Pennsylvania, United States
- Died: September 6, 2002 (aged 96); New Haven, Connecticut
- Education: Lafayette College, University at Buffalo
- Known for: Penicillin; Fetal heart monitor
- Awards: AMA Scientific Achievement Award
- Scientific career
- Fields: Medicine (obstetrics and gynaecology)
- Workplaces: Yale-New Haven Hospital; Yale School of Medicine

Orvan Walter Hess (June 18, 1906 – September 6, 2002) was an American physician noted for his early use of penicillin and the development of the fetal heart monitor. Hess was born in Baoba, Pennsylvania. At the age of two, after his mother's death, the family moved to Margaretville, New York where he grew up. Hess was inspired by Doctor Gordon Bostwick Maurer—who started Margaretville's first hospital in 1925— to study medicine. He married Dr. Maurer's sister, Carol Maurer, in 1928.

Hess went to Lafayette College and was graduated in 1927, and received his MD from the University at Buffalo. He completed an internship at Children's Hospital in Buffalo, New York and became an obstetrician and gynecologist.

For most of his career, Hess practiced at Yale-New Haven Hospital, interrupted by World War II service as a surgeon in the 48th Armored Medical Battalion attached to the 2nd Armored Division in the invasions of North Africa, Sicily and Normandy.

He was clinical professor of obstetrics and gynecology at the Yale School of Medicine. He also served as president of the Connecticut State Medical Society, and director of health services for the Connecticut Welfare Department. Hess died in New Haven at the age of 96.

Hess was predeceased by his wife Carol in 1998. He is survived by two daughters, Dr. Katherine Halloran of Lexington, and Carolyn Westerfield of Hamden; five grandchildren; and five great-granddaughters.

== Early use of penicillin ==
On March 14, 1942, John Bumstead and Hess became the first doctors in the world to successfully treat a patient (Anne Miller) with penicillin.

"Doctors had done everything possible, both surgically and medically," Dr. Hess said in a 1998 interview with Katie Krauss, the editor of Yale-New Haven Magazine and one of the many babies Dr. Hess delivered. "I went to see her and knew she was dying."

Dr. Hess went to talk to her internist, Dr. Bumstead, and found him asleep in the library. "While I was waiting for him to wake up," Dr. Hess said, "I sat and read the latest Reader's Digest, in which there was an article called 'Germ Killers From Earth', about the use of soil bacteria to kill streptococcal infection in animals."

He asked Dr. Bumstead, "Wouldn't it be wonderful if we had something like this gramicidin mentioned in the Reader's Digest?" This prompted Dr. Bumstead to speak with some colleagues who were studying penicillin and to obtain some for the patient, Anne Miller. The day after her first injection, Mrs. Miller's fever broke. She lived to be 90 years old, dying in 1999.

— New York Times

Hess received the American Medical Association's Scientific Achievement Award in 1979 for his work on this case.

== Fetal heart monitor development ==
Hess began working on a fetal heart monitor in the 1930s as a research fellow at Yale University due to his frustration with the limitations of using a stethoscope on a subject with two heartbeats and undergoing contractions.

In 1949, after World War II, Hess returned to Yale and resumed his work, along with postdoctoral fellow Dr. Edward Hon. In 1957, using a six-and-a-half-foot-tall machine, they became the first in the world to continuously monitor electrical cardiac signals from a fetus.

Through the 1960s, working with Wasil Kitvenko, the chief of the medical school's electronics laboratory, Dr. Hess continued to improve on the equipment, introducing telemetry and reducing the monitor's size. The device, which allowed monitoring to continue during labor, became one of the most-used tests in obstetrics.

The original machine still resides today in the basement of a building just outside the city of Hartford called the "Hartford Medical Society."
