= 48th Armored Medical Battalion =

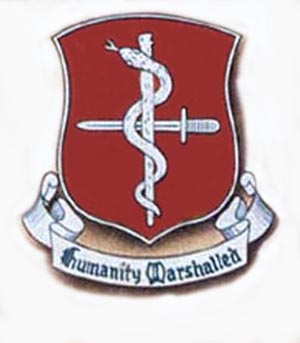
- Distinctive Unit Insignia
- Active: July 15, 1940 – c.1946 c.1950s – 1991
- Country: United States
- Branch: U.S. Army
- Type: Medical
- Part of: 2nd Armored Division
- Equipment: M35 surgical trucks M43 ambulances

Commanders
- 1st commander: Col. Abner Zehm
- 2nd commander: Major John S. Wier

The 48th Armored Medical Battalion was an American military medical/surgical unit attached to the 2nd Armored Division throughout World War II. The 48th participated in the invasions of North Africa, Sicily and Normandy.

The unit was formed on July 15, 1940, under the command of Col. Abner Zehm. In February 1942, Major John S. Wier became the Battalion Commander.

Major Wier requested surgical trucks for the unit. The army gave him six thousand dollars, enough for six 2 1/2 ton trucks to be converted for medical use.

On December 11, 1942, the 48th left Fort Dix, New Jersey, for North Africa, landing at Casablanca on December 24, 1942.

In the spring of 1943 they proceeded to Arzew in Algeria, then on to Tunis. On to Sicily and then to Tidworth Camp, England for an extended period of time.

The battalion landed on Omaha Beach on June 9, 1944 (D+3 at 13:00). The battalion stayed with the 2nd Armored Division throughout the advance on into Germany and then to Berlin.

After the war the unit returned to Camp Hood, Texas, for retraining before being disbanded.

The Battalion's World War II unit insignia consisted of a rod of Asclepius crossed with a dagger, on a silver bordered, red shield, above the words "Humanity Marshalled".

At a later date the 48th Medical Battalion was reformed, again as part of the 2nd Armored Division, serving until the divisions disbandment in 1991.

== Notable members ==
- Medic Everett "Chris" Christenson – killed in action (January 12, 1945)
- Doctor Orvan Hess – developed the fetal heart monitor after the war

== Sources ==
- "Forty-Eighth Medical Battalion". U.S. Army 2nd Armored "Hell on Wheels" Division. 2nd Armored Hell on Wheels. August 13, 2008.
- "US Army". The Wartime Memories Project. 2002. Archived from the original on 2005-10-25.
- "2nd Armored's History". 2ndarmored.com. CHG: Second Armored Division. August 4, 2007.
