= Brunner, Houston =

Coordinates: 29.773°N 95.408°W

Brunner is an area within Houston that was at one time a distinct community. Brunner was in west central Harris County, along the Houston and Texas Central Railway and 3 miles (4.8 km) west of Houston. In 1895 Brunner's population was 500, and it had two churches, a Baptist college, a public school, a saloon, and a German school. By 1888 a post office existed. The community had 200 residents in 1894. In 1905 the post office closed, and the post office in Houston handled the community's mail. During that year the community had 402 people. By 1915 the City of Houston took over what was Brunner, and it was no longer considered a community distinct from Houston.

== Gallery ==
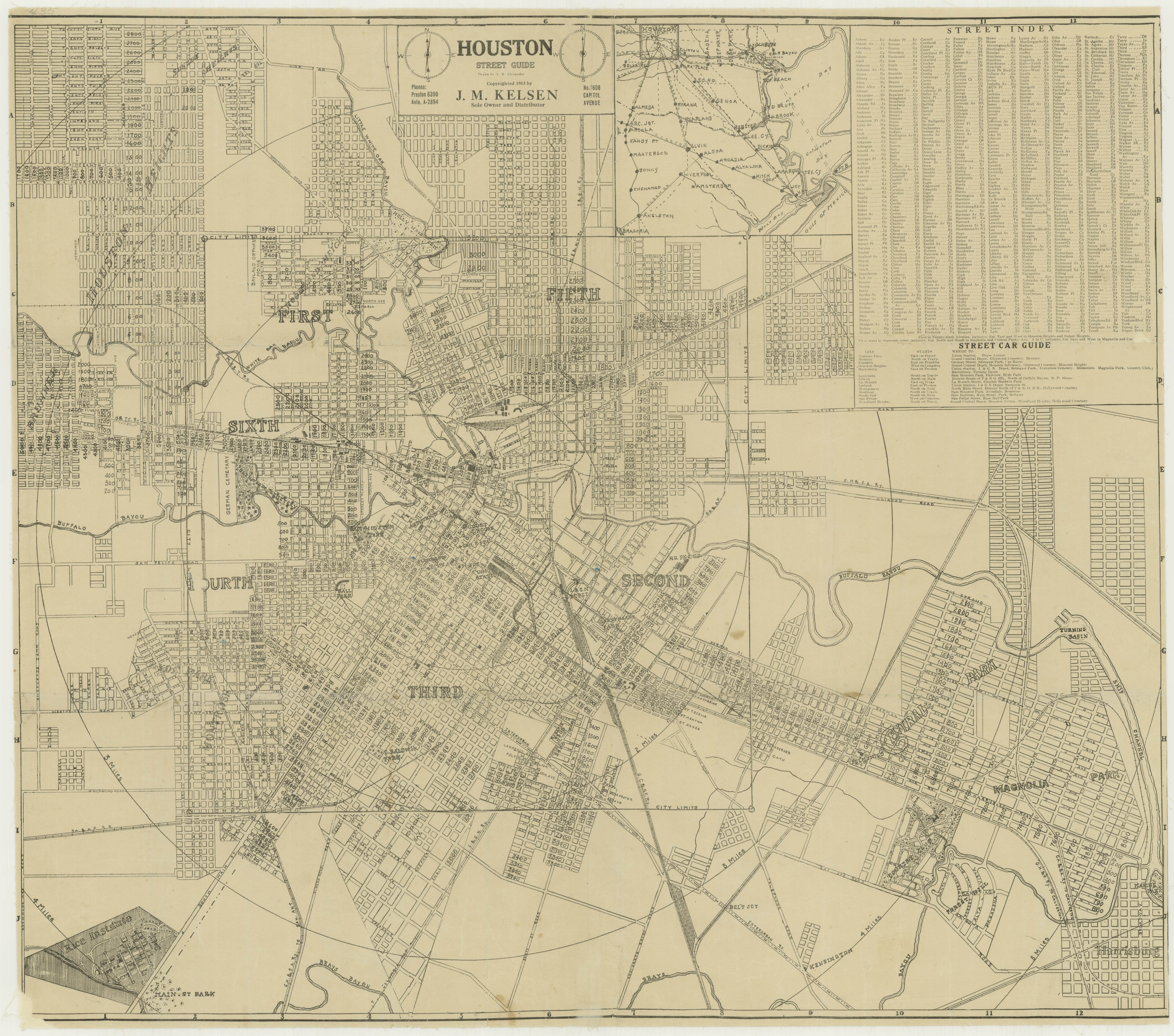
1913 map of the six wards of Houston, indicating Brunner

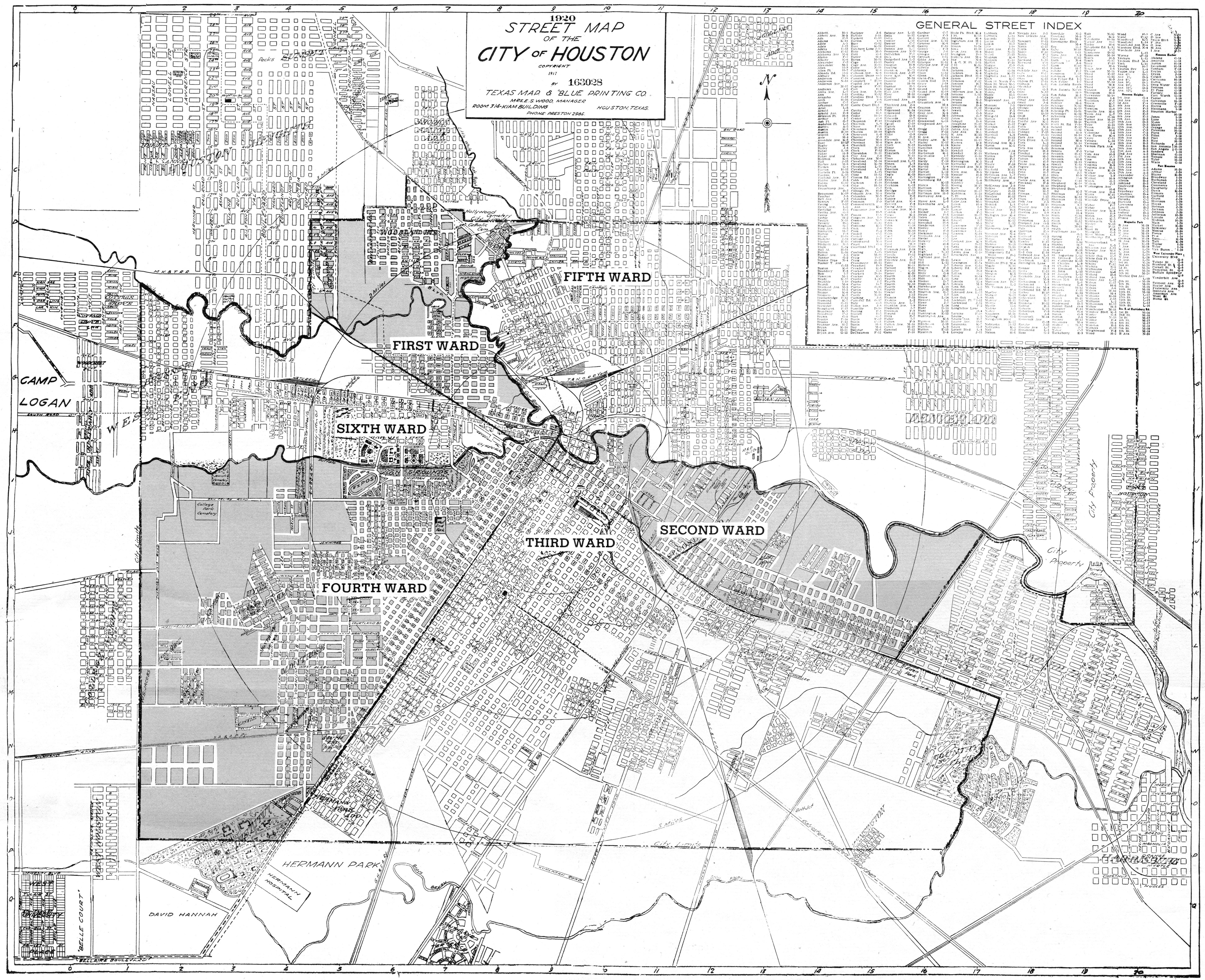
1920 map of the six wards of Houston, indicating Brunner
