= John Brunero =

American philosopher

Education
- Education: Columbia University (PhD)
- Thesis: Essay on Practical Reason and Instrumental Probability (2006)
- Doctoral advisor: Joseph Raz

John Brunero is an American philosopher and academic. He is currently the Robert R. Chambers Distinguished Professor of Philosophy at the University of Nebraska–Lincoln. He is known for his works on reasons.

== Awards and recognition ==
In 2016, Brunero's article 'Cognitivism about Practical Rationality' received the Article Prize from the American Philosophical Association.

In 2022, Brunero was selected for the FLAIR (Faculty Leadership in Academia: From Inspiration to Reality) program.

== Books ==
- Instrumental Rationality: The Normativity of Means-Ends Coherence (Oxford University Press, 2020)
