= William Henry Beierwaltes =

American physician (c.1917–2005)

- Born: c. 1917
- Died: August 14, 2005 (aged 87–88)
- Occupation: Physician

William Henry Beierwaltes (c. 1917 – August 14, 2005) was an American physician who was a pioneer in the use of nuclear medicine. Beierwaltes building on the established work of Saul Hertz, developed innovations in the use of iodine-131 and in surgery in treating thyroid cancer, in establishing a university training program in nuclear medicine and in the use of radiolabeled antibodies to detect cancer.

== Early years and education ==
Beierwaltes was born c. 1917, and grew up in Saginaw, Michigan. He spent the vast majority of his career at the University of Michigan, earning a bachelor's degree there in 1938, his medical degree in 1941 and completed his residency as an endocrinologist in 1945. He developed a lifelong focus on thyroid cancer after performing an autopsy in his third year of medical school on a patient who had died from the disease. One of his few times away from the University of Michigan was for an internship and residency at Cleveland City Hospital, where one of his assignments was a study of the use of an antithyroid drug in treatment of hyperthyroidism. After joining the faculty of the University of Michigan Medical School in 1945, he started to become involved in the growing field of nuclear medicine.

== Career and research ==
Beierwaltes was one of five doctors present at the first course teaching doctors how to use radioactive iodine for medical purposes, which was offered by the Atomic Energy Commission at its facility in Oak Ridge, Tennessee. He spent his career seeking methods to identify and treat cancer using radioisotopes. Early in his career, he established a clinic in which radioactive iodine was used to help diagnose and detect tumors in patients with hyperthyroidism and thyroid cancer. He became an advocate for a therapy that combined radioiodine and surgery, which has been accepted by the medical profession as the standard regimen for diagnosis and treatment of thyroid conditions.

He was named in 1952 as head of the Clinical Radioisotope Service at the University of Michigan. Beierwaltes wrote Clinical Use of Radioisotopes, published in 1957, which was one of the first books published in the field. When it was established in the early 1960s, Beierwaltes was promoted to chief of the Nuclear Medicine Division and helped form the nuclear medicine fellowship at the University of Michigan, one of the first such programs in the United States.

Results of a study Beierwaltes reported in 1950 showed that he was able to use x-rays to prevent blindness in eight of eleven patients with a form of the disease exophthalmos. The pituitary glands of these patients were believed to have been producing excessive amounts of thyroid-stimulating hormone which caused swelling in the eyesocket that could compress the optic nerve or ophthalmic artery leading to blindness. By x-raying the pituitary gland, the swelling was reduced. Three years after treatment patients had gained an average of 13 pounds and their eyes had receded an average of one-fifth of an inch.

Beierwaltes retired from the University of Michigan at age 70 and moved to Grosse Pointe, Michigan, where he continued work at the local St. John Hospital and at William Beaumont Hospital in Royal Oak, Michigan. He "finally and unequivocally" retired from clinical work on August 31, 1994. He died on August 14, 2005, aged 87 or 88.

== Legacy ==
Beierwaltes developed the concept of combining radioactive iodine with the hormone-like Iobenguane, so that the radioactivity could be detected when the substance traveled to cells in the adrenal gland and related tissues. Beierwaltes is co-holder of the patent on Iobenguane, which he developed in the 1970s to allow for imaging of the adrenal gland.

He was awarded the Scientific Achievement Award, the highest honor given by the American Medical Association, for his contributions to the medical profession as a clinician, teacher, and investigator.

== Personal life ==
Beierwaltes died at age 88 on August 14, 2005, in his home in Petoskey, Michigan, of natural causes.
