= Lucius Duncan Bulkley =

American physician (1845–1928)

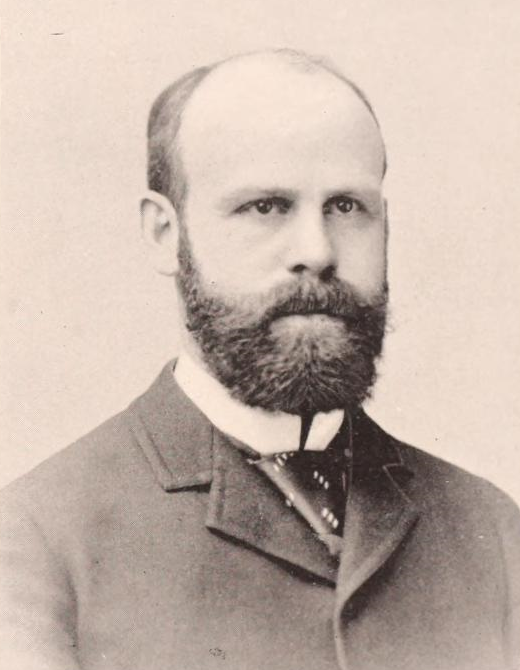
- Born: January 12, 1845; Manhattan
- Died: July 20, 1928 (aged 83); Englewood, New Jersey
- Occupations: Dermatologist, writer

Lucius Duncan Bulkley (January 12, 1845 – July 20, 1928) was an American dermatologist and alternative cancer treatment advocate.

== Biography ==
Bulkley was born in Manhattan. His father was Henry Daggett Bulkley. In 1869, he obtained his M.D. from the College of Physicians and Surgeons, New York. He was house physician at New York Hospital and travelled to Europe to study dermatology in London, Paris and Vienna.

Bulkley was awarded the Stevens Triennial Prize from the College of Physicians and Surgeons, for his essay Thermometry in Disease and the Alvarenga prize by the College of Physicians of Philadelphia for his monograph Syphilis in the Innocent, in 1891. He was Chairman of Dermatology and Syphilology of the American Medical Association. He was President of the New York Dermatological Society and the New York Academy of Medicine.

Bulkley edited the Archives of Dermatology (1874-1882), the only journal in English during this period devoted to dermatology. He founded the New York Skin and Cancer Hospital in 1883. He wrote on a variety of subjects including acne, eczema, relationship of diet to skin disease and cancer.

His 1885 book Acne, Its Etiology, Pathology, And Treatment, was positively reviewed in the British Medical Journal as a useful monograph for practitioners. It was the first textbook on acne. Bulkley advocated a vegetarian diet for treatment of psoriasis and other skin diseases.

Bulkley had three sons and three daughters. His daughter Elizabeth married Henry Harrington Janeway.

He died in Englewood, New Jersey, age 84.

== Cancer research ==
Bulkley believed that the fundamental cause of cancer was faulty metabolism, largely influenced by unhealthy dieting. He recommended his patients to practice simple living and avoid consuming meat, alcohol, tea and coffee. Bulkley held the same view of William Arbuthnot Lane that intestinal stasis may cause cancer. He commented that "I feel like saying that the toxins produced by the millions of micro-organisms generated through intestinal stasis and fecal putrefaction, are the real, incidental cause of cancer."

Bulkley argued that cancer is more frequent in advanced and richer nations, among people who indulge in luxuries. He noted that cancer occurs less frequently in rice-eating countries where little meat is eaten. He believed that cancer is a disease of civilization and can be cured by dietary, hygienic and medical measures without surgery. He firmly opposed the surgical treatment of cancer.

Bulkley recommended a vegetarian diet, moderate exercise, a simple life without stress and sufficient sleep to treat cancer. His recommended diet consisted of vegetables, fruits, butter, bread and cereals. The occasional egg or use of milk was allowed. He also prescribed the use of potassium acetate.

=== Reception ===
The Historical Atlas of Dermatology and Dermatologists, notes that:

[Bulkley] eventually became a dietary fanatic, convinced that cancer, skin cancer included, could be cured or prevented by adherence to dietary regimens to which he was privy. In the end his fanaticism destroyed his credibility, blinded the younger generation to the marvelous contributions he had made to the specialty in its formative years, and reduced him to a pathetic figure sitting silently and by himself at medical meetings he attended during his final days.

His two-volume book Cancer: Its Cause and Treatment, was widely reviewed in medical journals.

Bulkley was the editor of Cancer: A Practical Quarterly Journal Devoted to the Best Interests of Cancer. Physician Albert G. Hulett criticized the journal for rejecting radiotherapy and surgery. Another critic wrote that Bulkley and his collaborators from the journal were promoting unsafe treatments.

Bulkley's book Cancer and its Non-Surgical Treatment, published in 1921 was widely criticized by the medical community. A review in the Journal of the American Medical Association described it as an "unsourced and unpropitious book" and Bulkley's dietary ideas and opposition to surgical treatment of cancer as a "medical heresy". In 1924, Henry H. Whitehouse President of the New York Skin and Cancer Hospital sent a letter to the Journal of the American Medical Association stating that the medical profession and staff of the New York Skin and Cancer Hospital reject Bulkley's dietary treatment for cancer.

== Selected publications ==
- The Skin in Health and Disease (1880)
- Manual of Diseases of the Skin (1882)
- Acne, its Etiology, Pathology and Treatment (1885)
- Syphilis in the Innocent (1894)
- On the Restriction of Meat in the Treatment of Psoriasis (Dietetic and Hygienic Gazette, 1897)
- Eczema With An Analysis of Eight Thousand Cases of the Disease (1901)
- The Value of an Absolutely Vegetarian Diet in Psoriasis (1908)
- Diet and Hygiene in Diseases of the Skin (1913)
- Cancer: Its Cause and Treatment (1915)
- Medical Aspects of Cancer (Medical Record, 1915)
- Cancer From a Medical Standpoint (New York State Journal of Medicine, 1916)
- Medical Versus Surgical Treatment of Cancer (Medical Record, 1919)
- The Medical Treatment of Cancer (1919)
- Cancer and its Non-Surgical Treatment (1921)
- Proofs of the Constitutional Nature of Cancer (New York Medical Journal, 1921)
- Cancer is Never a Purely Local Disease (International Clinics, 1923)
