= George E. Pfahler =

American physician

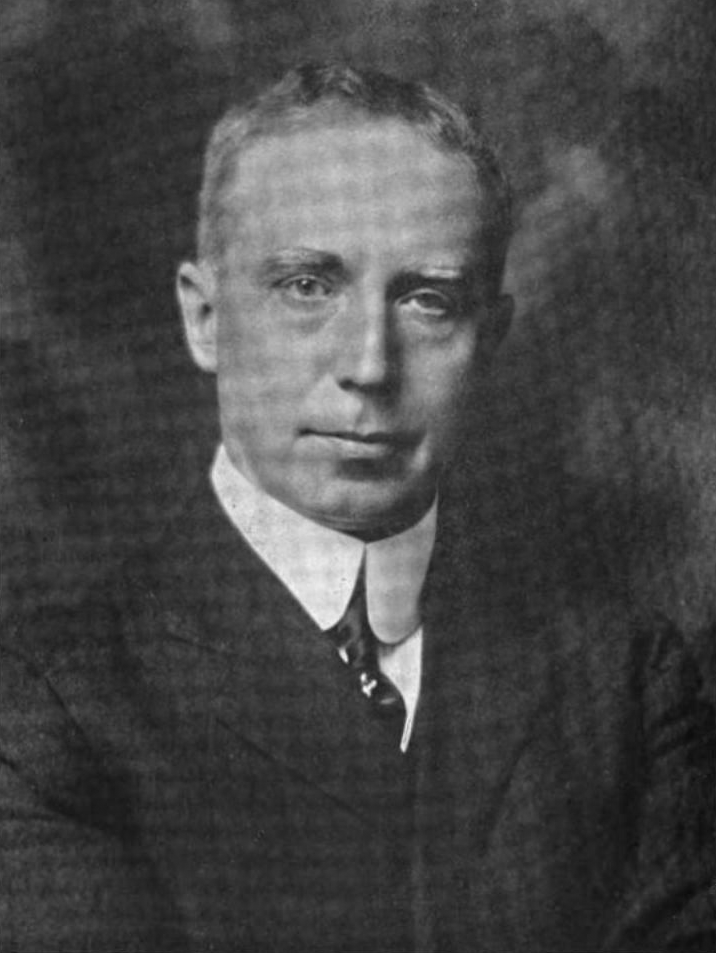
- Born: George Edward Pfahler; January 29, 1874; Numidia, Pennsylvania
- Died: January 29, 1957 (aged 83); Philadelphia, Pennsylvania
- Education: Medico-Chirurgical College of Philadelphia
- Occupation: Radiologist
- Spouses: Frances Simpson (m. 1908; died 1910) Muriel Wilkes Bennett (m. 1918)

Signature
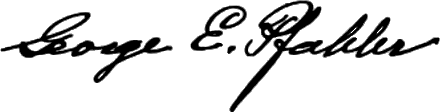

George Edward Pfahler (January 29, 1874 – January 29, 1957) was an American physician and one of the early influences on the specialty of radiology.

== Biography ==
George E. Pfahler was born in Numidia, Pennsylvania on January 29, 1874. In 1898, he graduated from the Medico-Chirurgical College of Philadelphia. By the next year, he was an assistant chief resident at Philadelphia General Hospital. The hospital's board of managers procured an x-ray machine, then known as a "roentgen ray machine", and they appointed Pfahler to operate it. The young doctor had set out to become an internal medicine physician, and at first he doubted whether x-rays would have much value in the clinical care of patients. The rest of Pfahler's career was defined by his focus on direct patient care applications of X-rays.

After residency, Pfahler spent the early years of his medical career as a clinical professor at the Medico-Chirurgical College and as the director of the radiology departments at Philadelphia General Hospital and the Medico-Chirurgical Hospital. The Medico-Chirurgical College merged with the University of Pennsylvania in 1916, and Pfahler became a professor and vice dean of radiology at that institution. He worked at the medical school through 1946, and afterwards he was an emeritus professor. He made advances both in diagnostic radiology and in radiotherapy, taking special interest in radiation treatment for oral and breast cancers.

Pfahler was the 1910-11 president of the American Roentgen Ray Society, and he was the president of the American Radium Society in 1922. The next year, he became the first president of the American College of Radiology (ACR). He won the ACR Gold Medal, the organization's highest award, in 1952.

Pfahler married Frances Simpson on November 21, 1908. She died on March 15, 1910, and he remarried to Muriel Wilkes Bennett on July 10, 1918.

He died at Graduate Hospital in Philadelphia on January 29, 1957.

The Pfahler Hall of Science at Ursinus College is named in his honor.
