= Arthur Purdy Stout =

American surgeon and pathologist (1885–1967)

- Born: November 30, 1885; New York, New York
- Died: December 21, 1967 (aged 82); New York, New York
- Education: Yale University (A.B.) & Columbia University College of Physicians & Surgeons (M.D.)
- Known for: Research in Surgical pathology
- Scientific career
- Fields: Medicine, surgery, pathology
- Notable students: Virginia Frantz Margaret Ransone Murray

Arthur Purdy Stout (1885–1967) was an American surgeon and pathologist.

== Early years and education ==
Arthur Purdy Stout was the fourth son of Joseph and Julia Frances (née Purdy) Stout. He attended the Pomfret School and Yale University, where he earned an A.B. degree in 1907. After spending a year abroad, Arthur entered the College of Physicians & Surgeons (CPS) of Columbia University. He completed his M.D. degree in 1912.

== Career at Columbia-Presbyterian Medical Center in New York ==
Stout was a surgical house-officer at Roosevelt Hospital in New York City; he then joined the staff of CPS in 1914 as an instructor in surgery. During World War I, Dr. Stout was a field surgeon in the U.S. Army in France (see image at right).

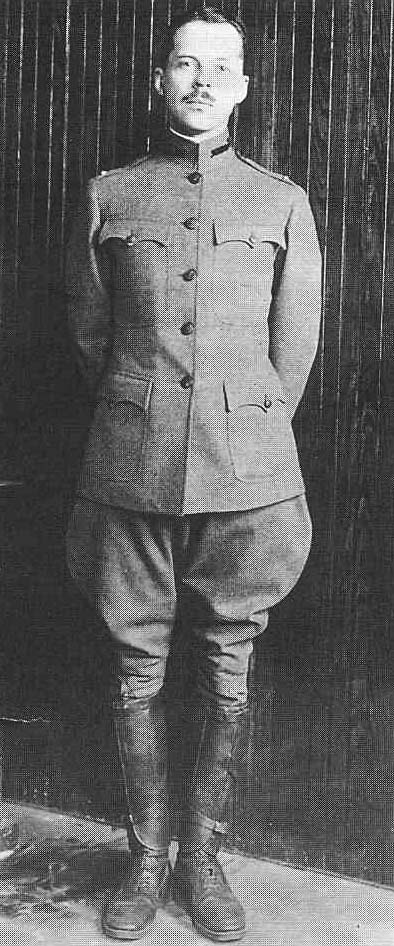
Lt. A.P. Stout in France, 1918 (US Army Photograph.)

Returning to CPS thereafter, he became an assistant professor of surgery in 1921, an associate professor in 1928 and a full Professor in 1947. Beginning in 1950, he also held the concomitant rank of Professor of Pathology.

Although trained as a surgeon, Stout turned all of his attention to the pathomorphologic findings in surgical specimens. In particular, he acquired a special expertise in tumor pathology. He served as director of the Laboratory of Surgical Pathology at the Columbia-Presbyterian Medical Center from the late 1920s until the early 1950s, and there trained many future leaders in diagnostic pathology. His colleagues included several prominent physicians and scientists, such as Virginia Kneeland Frantz, Cushman Haagensen, Saul Kay, Robert Totten, Margaret Ransone Murray, and Raffaele Lattes, who succeeded Stout as director of the laboratory.

Stout authored over 300 scientific articles and one monograph, entitled Human Cancer (1932). He also wrote three fascicles for the Atlas of Tumor Pathology, published by the Armed Forces Institute of Pathology. He belonged to several professional societies and was the recipient of many awards. In 1947, an organization of surgical pathologists was named the "Arthur Purdy Stout Club" in his honor. It still exists as the Arthur Purdy Stout Society of Surgical Pathologists, (Accessed 8-22-23) the members of which are dedicated to scholarship in surgical pathology.

== Retirement and subsequent years ==
When he retired from CPS in 1951, Stout became director of pathology at Francis Delafield Hospital, a municipal cancer hospital affiliated with Columbia University. In 1954, he coined the term fibromatosis (in the name congenital generalized fibromatosis, describing myofibromatosis). He remained a professor emeritus of Surgery at Columbia and a Consulting Pathologist at both Delafield and Presbyterian Hospitals. Stout died at age 82 on December 21, 1967, from complications of prostatic adenocarcinoma.

== Personal life ==
Dr. Stout married Jean Stoddart in 1915. She was born in Canada. They had one child, Julia Frances Stout, whose birthday was in 1916.
