= Juan A. del Regato =

American oncologist

- Born: 1 March 1909
- Died: 12 June 1999 (aged 90)

Juan A. del Regato (1 March 1909—12 June 1999) was an oncologist.

== Awards ==
1993 AMA Scientific Achievement Award
