= Henry Kaplan (physician) =

American physician

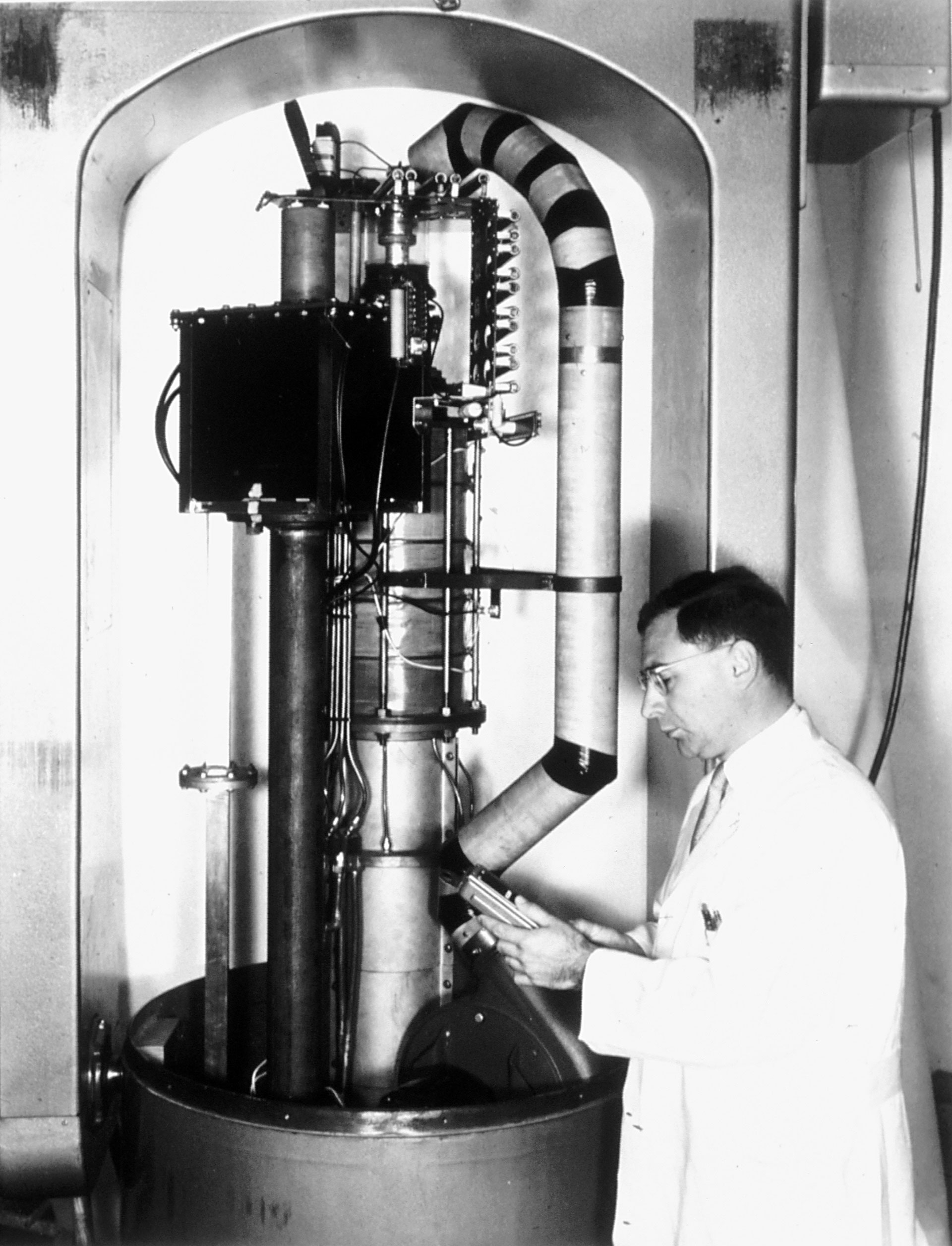
Dr. Henry Kaplan, in the 1950s, with an early model of the linear accelerator developed to treat cancer. For this picture the protective hood was removed, revealing the electronic insides of the six-million-volt machine, used for radiation treatment.

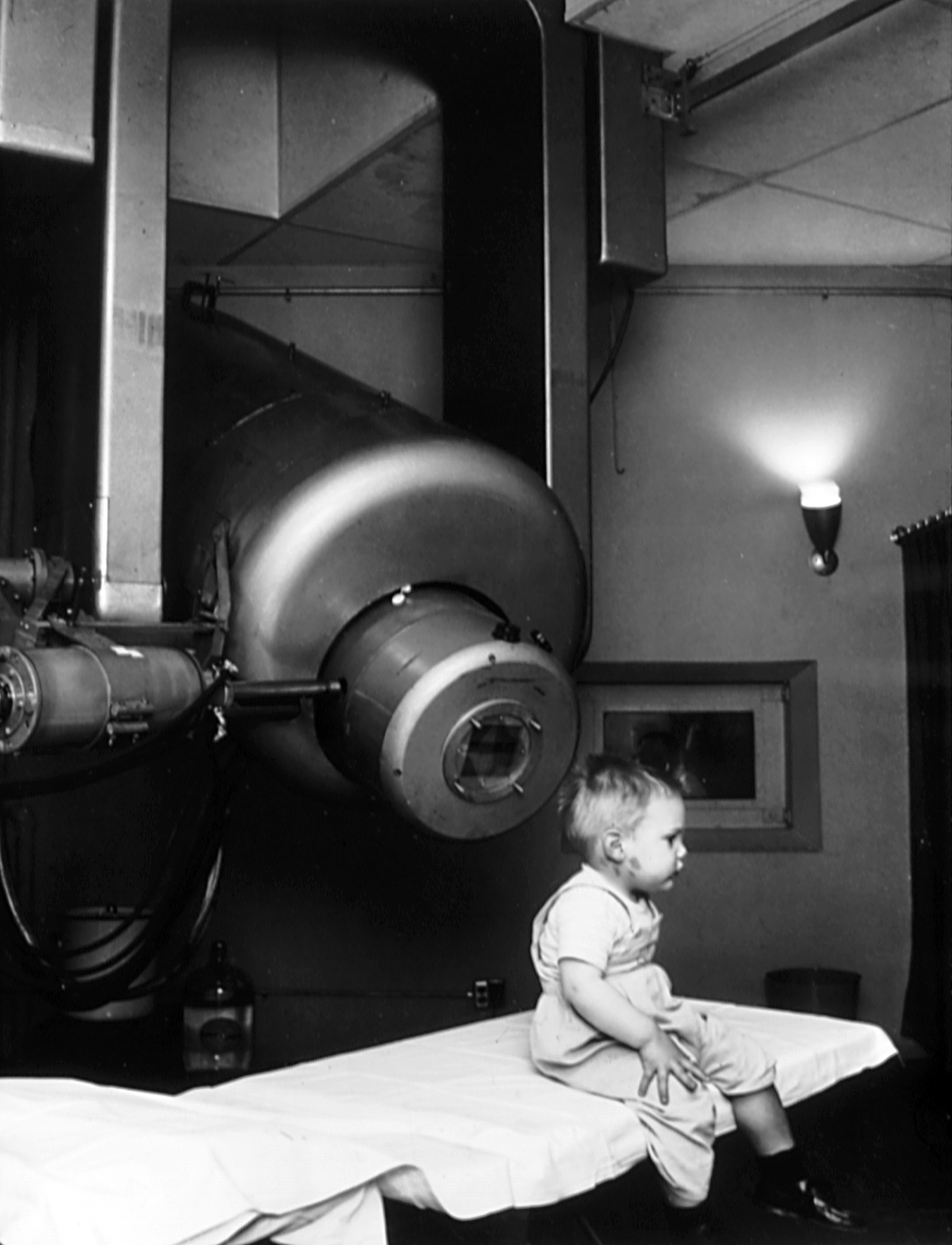
Gordon Isaacs, the first patient treated with the linear accelerator (radiation therapy) for retinoblastoma in 1957. Gordon's right eye was removed January 11, 1957 because the cancer had spread. His left eye, however, had only a localized tumor that prompted Henry Kaplan to try to treat it with the electron beam. Gordon is now living in the East Bay, and his vision in the left eye is normal.

Henry Seymour Kaplan (April 24, 1918 – February 4, 1984) was an American radiologist who pioneered in radiation therapy and radiobiology.

== Career ==
Kaplan earned his degree from Rush Medical College in Chicago, after which he trained at the University of Minnesota, Yale University and the National Cancer Institute. He once said he became interested in oncology after his father died of lung cancer, the same disease which killed Dr. Kaplan, a non-smoker.

Together with Edward Ginzton, he developed the first medical linear accelerator in the United States while he worked at the Stanford University Medical Center of Stanford University. The six million volt machine was first used for treatment in 1956, soon after the earliest linac-based radiation therapy, first used in London, England, in 1953. The first patient treated by Kaplan was Gordon Isaacs, who suffered from retinoblastoma of his right eye, and the disease threatened his left eye. The patient survived into adulthood with normal vision in his left eye. His main focus was on Hodgkin's disease, which was fatal before radiation therapy was used.

In 1969, he became the first physician credited with the Atoms for Peace Prize. He was the first radiologist elected to the National Academy of Sciences in 1972. In 1979, he received the Charles F. Kettering Prize from the General Motors Cancer Research Foundation.
