= Center for Radiological Research =

Research institute in New York City

The Center for Radiological Research (CRR) is a research institute in New York City. It was founded in 1916 at Memorial Hospital by Gioacchino Failla before moving to Columbia University in 1942. It has been described as the oldest and largest research center of its kind in the world. Achievements by the CRR under Failla include constructing the first radon generator in the US and building the first human phantom in the US.
