= Edna P. Bruner =

Canadian and American minister

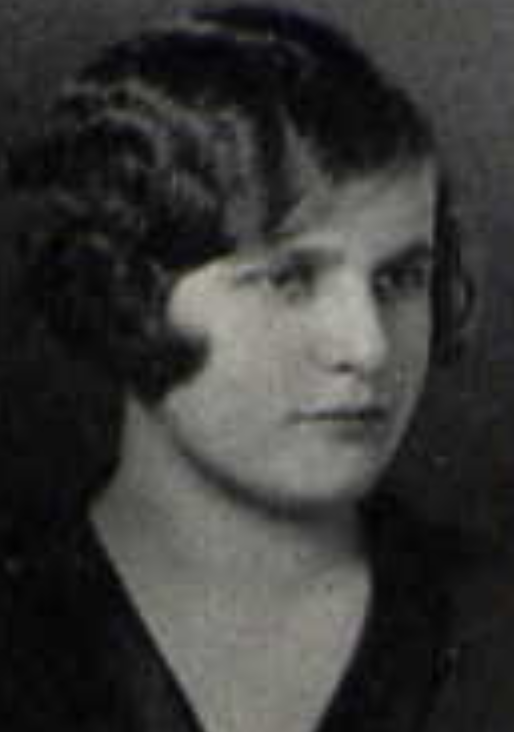
- Bruner from the 1929 yearbook of St. Lawrence University
- Born: Edna Pearl Bruner; May 14, 1906; Ruthven, Ontario, Canada
- Died: August 3, 1997 (aged 91); Boston, Massachusetts, U.S.
- Occupations: Minister, educational consultant

Edna Pearl Bruner (May 14, 1906 – August 3, 1997) was a Canadian and American minister and educational consultant in the Unitarian Universalist denomination.

== Early life and education ==
Bruner was born and raised in Ruthven, Ontario, Canada, the daughter of Albert Leonard Bruner and Nora May Peterson Bruner. While she was still in high school, Bruner became junior superintendent of the Young People's Christian Union, a Universalist youth organization. She graduated from St. Lawrence University with a Bachelor of Arts degree in 1929, and a Bachelor of Divinity degree in 1931.

== Career ==
Bruner was ordained as a Universalist minister in 1930. She served as a pastor in Waterloo, Iowa, from 1930 to 1940, in Canton, New York, from 1945 to 1950, and in Kennebunk, Maine, from 1968 to 1972. She was also dean of the Midwest Universalist Summer Institute in Michigan for three years.

From 1940 to 1968, Bruner was a field worker and educational consultant on the national staffs of the Council of Liberal Churches and the Unitarian Universalist Association, based in Boston. She toured nationally in this work, giving lectures and introducing local congregations and church women's groups to curriculum materials for religious education.

== Personal life ==
Bruner became a United States citizen by naturalization in 1941. She died in 1997, at the age of 91, in Boston. There is a collection of her papers in the library of Harvard Divinity School.
