= Edna Baxter Bruner =

American violinist

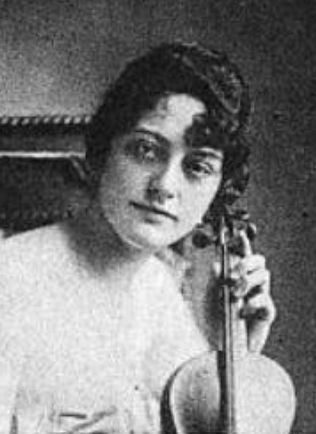
- Edna Baxter Bruner, from a 1927 publication
- Born: July 6, 1894; Chicago, Illinois, U.S.
- Died: October 23, 1978 (age 84); Hammond, Indiana, U.S.
- Occupation(s): Violinist, music educator

Edna Baxter Bruner (July 6, 1894 – October 23, 1978) was an American violinist, pianist, and music educator. She taught violin and piano students at the Chicago Piano College and the Hammond School of Music.

== Early life and education ==
Bruner was born in Chicago, the daughter of Otis Willard Bruner and Maude Baxter Bruner. Her mother was a pianist and music educator.

== Career ==
Bruner toured the United States and Canada as a violinist. She and her mother both taught at the Chicago Piano College (later known as the Hammond School of Music), in Chicago and in Hammond, Indiana. She was head of both the piano and violin departments at Hammond after her mother died in 1941. She continued teaching, and was principal of the Hammond school through the 1950s.

She was a member of the Daughters of the American Revolution and the Hammond Historical Society.

== Personal life ==
Bruner died in 1978, at the age of 84, in Hammond, Indiana.
