= American Radium Society =

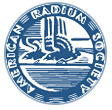
- Founded: 1916
- Purpose: "Devoted to the study and treatment of cancer."
- Location(s): American Radium Society; Los Angeles, California
- Origins: Philadelphia, Pennsylvania
- Region served: United States
- Method: Cancer research, public policy, education and service
- Key people: Kenneth Rosenzweig, President John “Drew” Ridge, MD, PhD, Secretary; Quynh-Thu Le, MD, Treasurer Adeena Bleich, Executive Director
- Website: americanradiumsociety.org

The American Radium Society is a medical association devoted to the study and treatment of cancer. It was founded in 1916.

The Society's original mission was to further "the scientific study of radium in relation to its physical properties and therapeutic applications" distinguishing it from the American Roentgen Ray Society (ARRS). The society's mission was expanded in 1950 to include "the treatment of neoplastic and allied diseases and the study and application of ionizing radiation."

In 1933, The ARS founded the annual Janeway Lecture in honor of Henry Harrington Janeway, a pioneer in radium therapy. The first Janeway Lecture, "Early Experience in Radium Therapy", was given by the pathologist James Ewing. The lecture is delivered at the society's annual general meeting with the lecturer chosen for their "outstanding scientific contributions". The 2014 Janeway Lecturer was Murray F. Brennan of the Memorial Sloan Kettering Cancer Center. Since 1937 each Janeway Lecturer is presented with the Janeway Medal.

== Past presidents ==
The society's first president was the Canadian physician W. H. B. Aikins, known as the founder of radiotherapy in Canada. Other past presidents have included:

- 1920 Henry K. Pancoast, M.D.
- 1942 Hayes E. Martin, M.D.
- 1954 Edith Hinkley Quimby, Sc.D.
- 1963 Gilbert H. Fletcher, M.D.
- 1971 James F. Nolan, M.D.
- 1976 Felix N. Rutledge, M.D.
- 1978 Richard H. Jesse, M.D.
- 1980 Alfred S. Ketcham, M.D.

== See also ==
- Health Physics Society
- American Academy of Health Physics
