= Gioacchino Failla =

American physicist

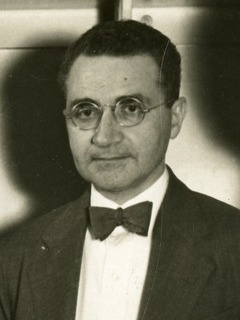
- Failla in 1937
- Born: July 19, 1891; Castelbuono Palermo, Sicily
- Died: December 15, 1961 (aged 70); Downers Grove near Chicago, Illinois, U.S.
- Education: Columbia University; Sorbonne
- Known for: Biophysics; Radiobiology
- Awards: Pulitzer Scholarship; Leonard Prize; Janeway Medal; Caldwell Medal; Gold Medal of the Radiological Society of North America; Ewing Society Medal; American Cancer Society; Annual National Award; Judd Cancer Award
- Scientific career
- Fields: Physics; Health Physics; Medical Physics
- Workplaces: Memorial Hospital (New York City, New York); Memorial Sloan Kettering Cancer Center; Argonne National Laboratory
- Doctoral advisor: Marie Curie

Gioacchino Failla (19 July 1891 – 15 December 1961) was an Italian-born American physicist. A pioneer in both biophysics and radiobiology, he was particularly noted for his work on the role of radiation as a cause of cancer and genetic mutation. He was born in Castelbuono in the Province of Palermo and emigrated with his family to the United States in 1906. After his retirement from Columbia University's Center for Radiological Research in 1960, he was appointed Senior Scientist Emeritus in the Radiological Physics Division of the Argonne National Laboratory in Illinois. He was killed in a car accident near the laboratory at the age of 70.

== Professional service ==
- Committee on Radiation Units, Standardization and Protection
- International Commission on Radiation Protection, ICRP
- National Commission on Radiation Protection, NCRP
- National Defense Research Committee
- Radiological Instrument Panel of the Armed Forces Special Weapons Project
- Advisory Committee on Isotope Distributions
- Advisory Committee on Biology and Medicine of the U.S. A.E.C. and the Genetics Committee
- National Academy of Sciences Committee on Biological Effects of Atomic Radiation

== Honorary memberships ==
- British Institute of Radiology
- The James Ewing Society, American Society for the Control of Cancer, now known as the American Cancer Society
- Radiological Society of North America

== Awards and honors ==
- Pulitzer Scholarship, awarded to graduates of grammar school that were examined for eligibility to receive one of 10 scholarships offered annually by Joseph Pulitzer. The subjects included in the written examination were grammar, dictation, reading, composition, American history, geography, and arithmetic.
- American Cancer Society Annual National Award
- Caldwell Medal of the American Roentgen Ray Society
- Leonard Prize of the American Roentgen Ray Society
- James Ewing Society Medal
- Gold Medal of the Radiological Society of North America
- 1939, Janeway Medal of the American Radium Society, "Some Aspects of the Biological Action of Ionizing Radiation"
- Katherine Berkan Judd Cancer Award from MSKCC for cancer research for an investigator who has made major advances toward the control and cure of cancer.
- He received an honorary doctorate degree from the University of Rochester.

=== Failla Memorial Lecture ===
- Failla Memorial Lecture presented annually by the Greater New York Chapter of the Health Physics Society and the Radiological Medical Physics Society

== Patents ==
- Stopcock, 1925.
- Method and means for applying radium emanation, 1930.
- Method and means for treatment by radiations, 1934.
- Means for effecting therapeutic implantations, 1935.
- Methods and means for testing radiant energy, 1937.
- Testing method and apparatus, 1937.
- Radiation measuring device, 1953.
- Radiation meter, 1954.
- Radiation detection device, 1956.
- Method of using and manufacturing plastic equivalent to organic materials, 1961.
