= International Commission on Radiation Units and Measurements =

The International Commission on Radiation Units and Measurements (ICRU) is a standardization body set up in 1925 by the International Congress of Radiology, originally as the X-Ray Unit Committee until 1950. Its objective "is to develop concepts, definitions and recommendations for the use of quantities and their units for ionizing radiation and its interaction with matter, in particular with respect to the biological effects induced by radiation".

The ICRU is a sister organisation to the International Commission on Radiological Protection (ICRP). In general terms the ICRU defines the units, and the ICRP recommends how they are used for radiation protection.

== Development ==
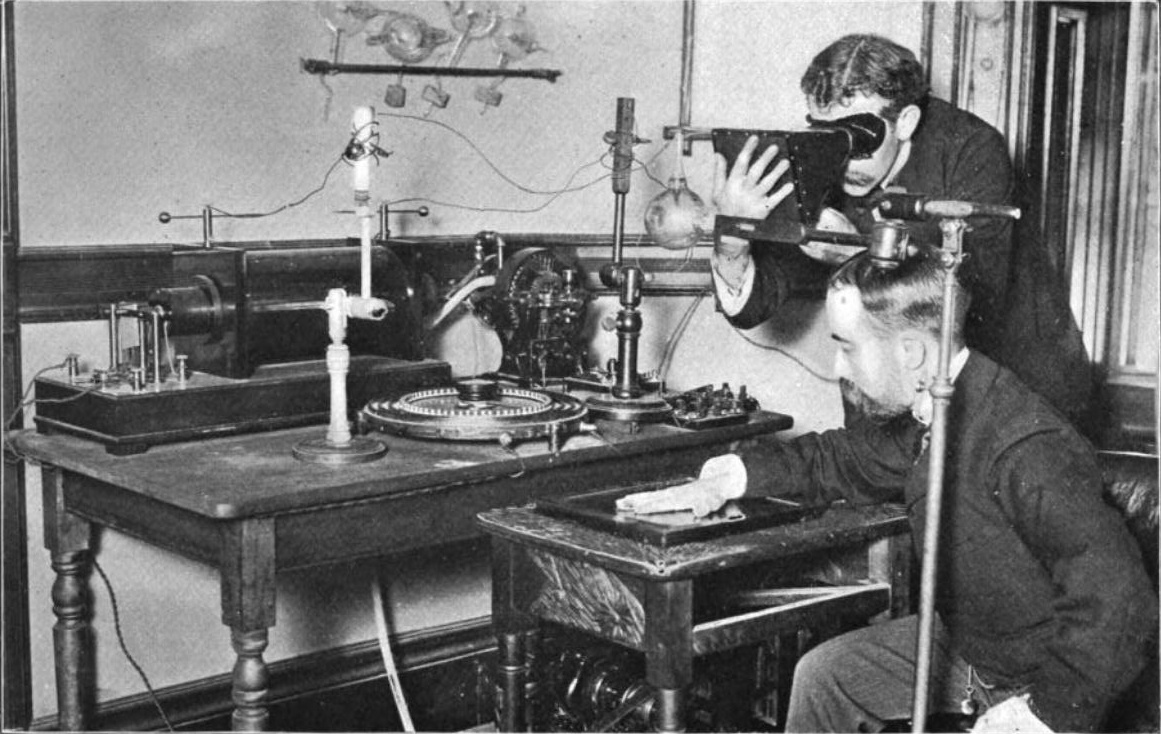
Using early Crookes tube X-Ray apparatus in 1896. One man is viewing his hand with a fluoroscope to optimise tube emissions, the other has his head close to the tube. No precautions are being taken.

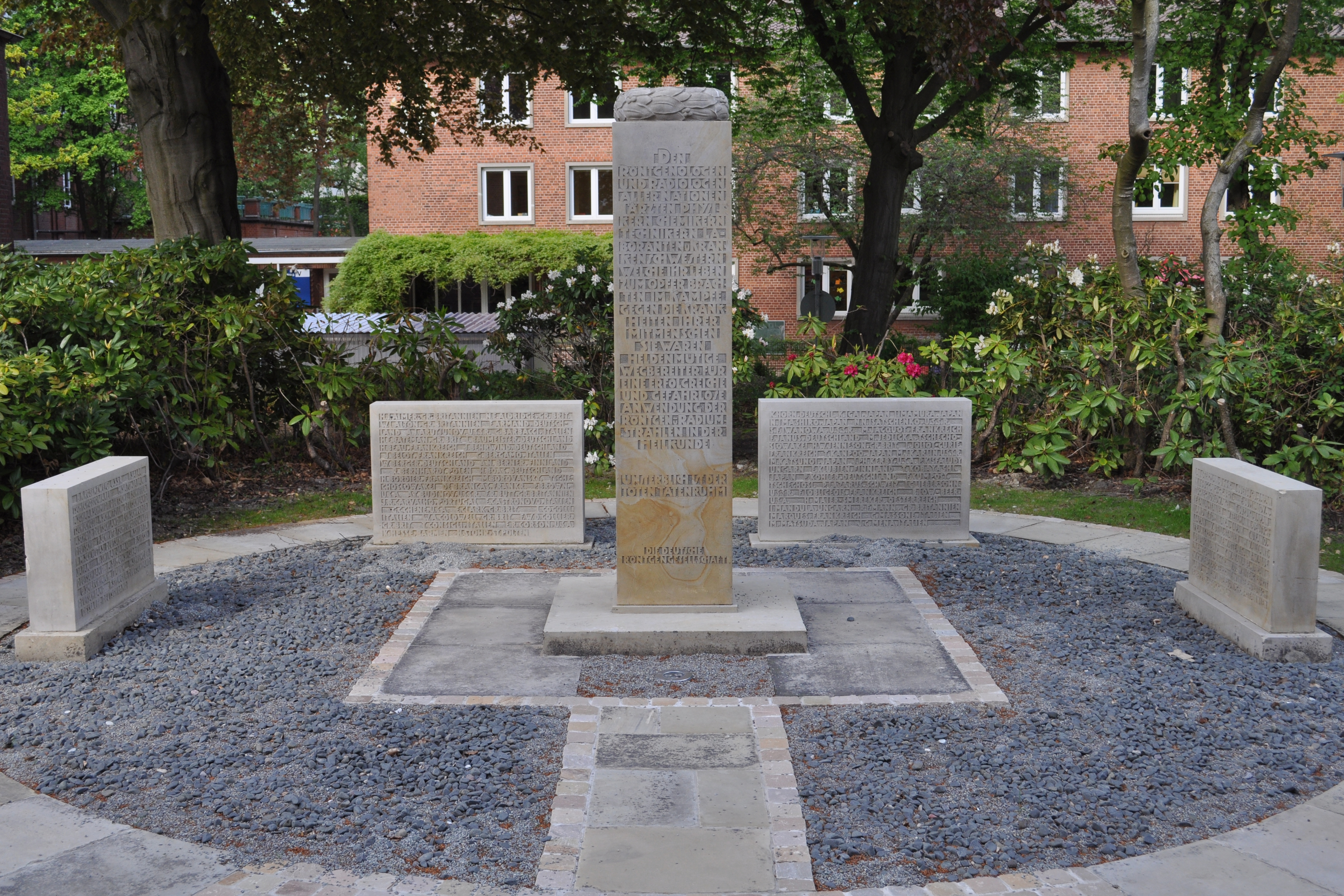
Monument to the X-ray and Radium Martyrs of All Nations erected 1936 at St. Georg hospital in Hamburg, commemorating 359 early radiology workers.

During the first two decades of its existence, its formal meetings were held during the International Congress of Radiology, but from 1950 onwards, when its mandate was extended, it has met annually. Until 1953, the president of the ICRU was a national of the country that was hosting the ICR, but in that year it was decided to elect a permanent commission - the first permanent chairman being Lauriston S. Taylor who had been a member of the commission since 1928 and secretary since 1934. Taylor served until 1969 and on his retirement was accorded the position of honorary chairman which we held until his death in 2004, aged 102.

In the late 1950s the ICRU was invited by the CGPM to join other scientific bodies to work with the International Committee for Weights and Measures (CIPM) in the development of a system of units that could be used consistently over many disciplines. This body, initially known as the "Commission for the System of Units" (renamed in 1964 as the "Consultative Committee for Units") was responsible overseeing the development of the International System of Units (SI).

In the late 1950s the ICRU started publishing reports on an irregular basis - on average two to three a year. In 2001 the publication cycle was regularised and reports are now published bi-annually under the banner "Journal of the ICRU".

== Current operation ==
The commission has a maximum of fifteen members who serve for four years and who, since 1950, have been nominated by the incumbent commissioners. Members are selected for their scientific ability and is widely regarded as the foremost panel of experts in radiation medicine and in the other fields of ICRU endeavor. The commission is funded by the sale of reports, by grants from the European Commission, the US National Cancer Institute and the International Atomic Energy Agency and indirectly by organisations and companies who provide meeting venues. Commissioners, many of whom have full-time university or research centre appointments, have their expenses reimbursed, but otherwise they receive no remuneration from the ICRU.

== Radiation quantities ==
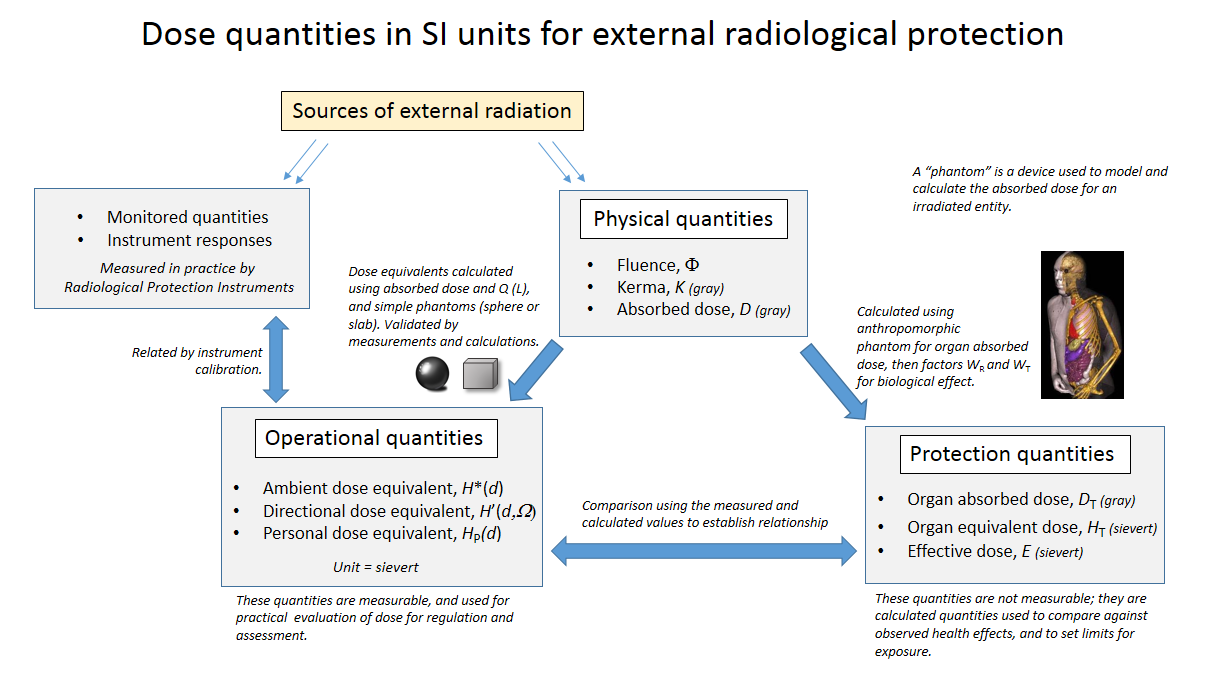
External dose quantities used in radiation protection and dosimetry based on ICRU 57, jointly developed with the ICRP

Relation between some ionizing radiation units

The commission has been responsible for defining and introducing many of the following units of measure. The number of different units for various quantities is indicative of changes of thinking in world metrology, especially the movement from cgs to SI units.

The following table shows radiation quantities in SI and non-SI units.

Ionizing radiation related quantities
| Quantity | Unit | Symbol | Derivation | Year | SI equivalent |
|---|---|---|---|---|---|
| Activity (A) | becquerel | Bq | s^{−1} | 1974 | SI unit |
| Activity (A) | curie | Ci | 3.7×10^{10} s^{−1} | 1953 | 3.7×10^{10} Bq |
| Activity (A) | rutherford | Rd | 10^{6} s^{−1} | 1946 | 1000000 Bq |
| Exposure (X) | coulomb per kilogram | C/kg | C⋅kg^{−1} of air | 1974 | SI unit |
| Exposure (X) | röntgen | R | esu / 0.001293 g of air | 1928 | 2.58×10^{−4} C/kg |
| Absorbed dose (D) | gray | Gy | J⋅kg^{−1} | 1974 | SI unit |
| Absorbed dose (D) | erg per gram | erg/g | erg⋅g^{−1} | 1950 | 1.0×10^{−4} Gy |
| Absorbed dose (D) | rad | rad | 100 erg⋅g^{−1} | 1953 | 0.010 Gy |
| Equivalent dose (H) | sievert | Sv | J⋅kg^{−1} × W_{R} | 1977 | SI unit |
| Equivalent dose (H) | röntgen equivalent man | rem | 100 erg⋅g^{−1} × W_{R} | 1971 | 0.010 Sv |
| Effective dose (E) | sievert | Sv | J⋅kg^{−1} × W_{R} × W_{T} | 1977 | SI unit |
| Effective dose (E) | röntgen equivalent man | rem | 100 erg⋅g^{−1} × W_{R} × W_{T} | 1971 | 0.010 Sv |

Although the United States Nuclear Regulatory Commission permits the use of the units curie, rad, and rem alongside SI units, the European Union European units of measurement directives required that their use for "public health ... purposes" be phased out by 31 December 1985.

== Administration ==
The Commission's secretariat is in Stockholm and its legal status is that of British charity (Not-for-profit organisation).

== See also ==
- International Commission on Radiological Protection (ICRP)
- Gray (unit)
- International Radiation Protection Association (IRPA)
- Radiation protection
- Sievert
