= Radiation exposure (disambiguation) =

Radiation exposure may refer to:

- Exposure (radiation), caused by ionizing photons, namely X-rays and gamma rays; or ionizing particles, usually alpha particles, neutrons, protons, or electrons
- Humans being subjected to an ionizing radiation hazard, either by irradiation or contamination
- In modern radiology, and in scientific papers from the early 20th century, radiation exposure may refer to kerma (physics)
- Exposure (photography), photographic film exposure to ionizing radiation
- Any material being subjected to even everyday levels of any type of radiation, such as heat or light
- Radiation Exposure Compensation Act, a federal statute of the United States providing for the monetary compensation of people who contracted cancer and a number of other specified diseases as a direct result of their exposure to radiation under certain circumstances
- Radiation Exposure Monitoring, a system for monitoring exposure
