= Gray (unit) =

SI derived unit of absorbed dose of ionizing radiation

gray
- Unit system: SI
- Unit of: absorbed dose of ionizing radiation
- Symbol: Gy
- Named after: Louis Harold Gray

Conversions
1 Gy in ...	... is equal to ...
- SI base units: m^{2}⋅s^{−2}
- CGS units (non-SI): 100 rad

The gray (symbol: Gy) is the unit of ionizing radiation dose in the International System of Units (SI), defined as the absorption of one joule of radiation energy per kilogram of matter.

It is used as a unit of the radiation quantity absorbed dose that measures the energy deposited by ionizing radiation in a unit mass of absorbing material, and is used for measuring the delivered dose in radiotherapy, food irradiation and radiation sterilization. It is important in predicting likely acute health effects, such as acute radiation syndrome, and is used to calculate equivalent dose using the sievert, which is a measure of the stochastic (probable) health effect on the human body.

The gray is also used in radiation metrology as a unit of the radiation quantity kerma; defined as the sum of the initial kinetic energies of all the charged particles liberated by uncharged ionizing radiation (Note: I.e., indirectly ionizing radiation such as photons and neutrons) in a sample of matter per unit mass. The unit was named after British physicist Louis Harold Gray, a pioneer in the measurement of X-ray and radium radiation and their effects on living tissue.

The gray was adopted as part of the International System of Units in 1975. The corresponding cgs unit to the gray is the rad (equivalent to 0.01 Gy), which remains common largely in the United States, though "strongly discouraged" in the style guide for U.S. National Institute of Standards and Technology.

== Applications ==
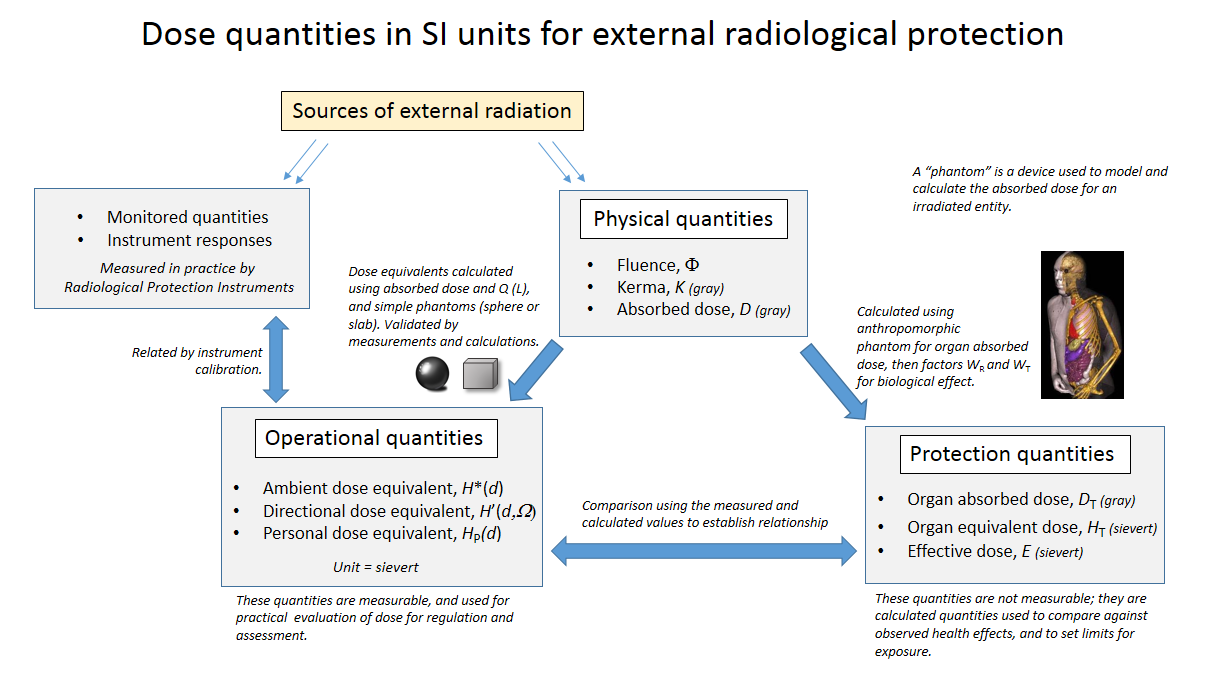
External dose quantities used in radiation protection and dosimetry

The gray has a number of fields of application in measuring dose:

=== Radiobiology ===
The measurement of absorbed dose in tissue is of fundamental importance in radiobiology and radiation therapy as it is the measure of the amount of energy the incident radiation deposits in the target tissue. The measurement of absorbed dose is a complex problem due to scattering and absorption, and many specialist dosimeters are available for these measurements, and can cover applications in 1-D, 2-D and 3-D.

In radiation therapy, the amount of radiation applied varies depending on the type and stage of cancer being treated. For curative cases, the typical dose for a solid epithelial tumor ranges from 60 to 80 Gy, while lymphomas are treated with 20 to 40 Gy. Preventive (adjuvant) doses are typically around 45–60 Gy in 1.8–2 Gy fractions (for breast, head, and neck cancers).

The average radiation dose from a pelvic CT scan is 6 mGy, and that from a selective CT scan of the abdomen and the pelvis is 14 mGy.

=== Radiation protection ===
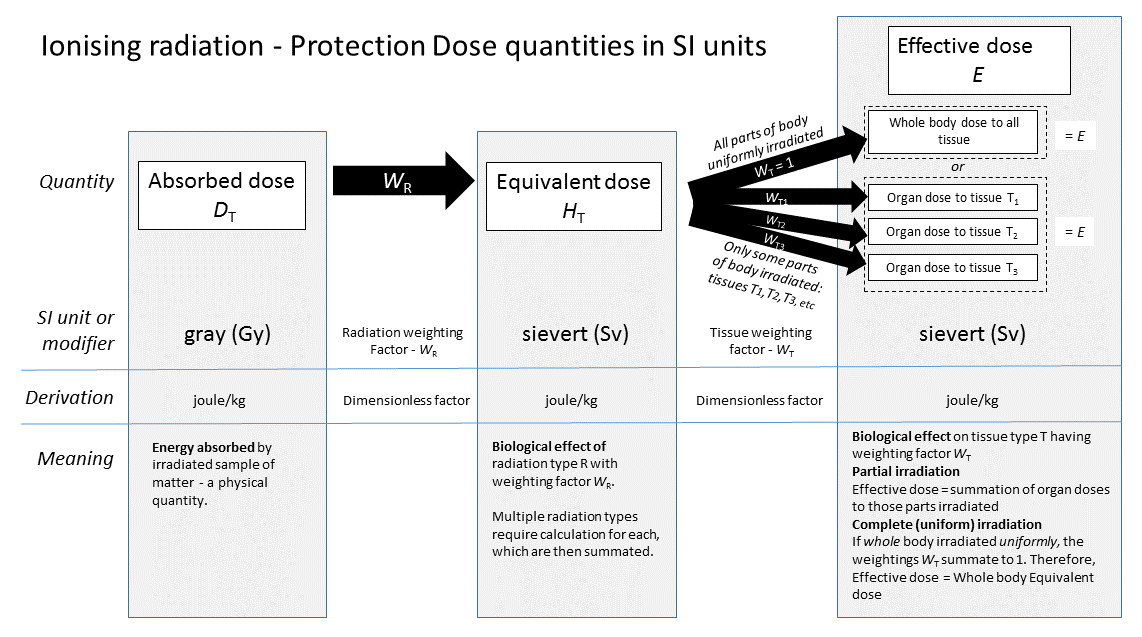
Relationship of ICRU/ICRP computed Protection dose quantities and units

The absorbed dose also plays an important role in radiation protection, as it is the starting point for calculating the stochastic health risk of low levels of radiation, which is defined as the probability of cancer induction and genetic damage. The gray measures the total absorbed energy of radiation, but the probability of stochastic damage also depends on the type and energy of the radiation and the types of tissues involved. This probability is related to the equivalent dose in sieverts (Sv), which has the same dimensions as the gray. It is related to the gray by weighting factors described in the articles on equivalent dose and effective dose.

Relation between some ionizing radiation units

The International Committee for Weights and Measures states: "In order to avoid any risk of confusion between the absorbed dose D and the dose equivalent H, the special names for the respective units should be used, that is, the name gray should be used instead of joules per kilogram for the unit of absorbed dose D and the name sievert instead of joules per kilogram for the unit of dose equivalent H."

$$1 \ \mathrm{Gy} = 1\ \frac{\mathrm{J}}{\mathrm{kg}}= 1\ \frac{\mathrm{m}^2}{\mathrm{s}^{2}}$$

The accompanying diagrams show how absorbed dose (in grays) is first obtained by computational techniques, and from this value the equivalent doses are derived. For X-rays and gamma rays the gray is numerically the same value when expressed in sieverts, but for alpha particles one gray is equivalent to 20 sieverts, and a radiation weighting factor is applied accordingly.

=== Radiation poisoning ===
The gray is conventionally used to express the severity of what are known as "tissue effects" from doses received in acute exposure to high levels of ionizing radiation. These are effects that are certain to happen, as opposed to the uncertain effects of low levels of radiation that have a probability of causing damage. A whole-body acute exposure to 5 grays or more of high-energy radiation usually leads to death within 14 days. The LD_{1}, LD_{50} and LD_{99} is 2.5, 5 and 8 Gy, respectively. The LD_{50} dose represents 375 joules for a 75 kg adult.

=== Absorbed dose in matter ===
The gray is used to measure absorbed dose rates in non-tissue materials for processes such as radiation hardening, food irradiation and electron irradiation. Measuring and controlling the value of absorbed dose is vital to ensuring correct operation of these processes.

=== Kerma ===
Kerma ("kinetic energy released per unit mass") is used in radiation metrology as a measure of the liberated energy of ionisation due to irradiation, and is expressed in grays. Importantly, kerma dose is different from absorbed dose, depending on the radiation energies involved, partially because ionization energy is not accounted for. Whilst roughly equal at low energies, kerma is much higher than absorbed dose at higher energies, because some energy escapes from the absorbing volume in the form of bremsstrahlung (X-rays) or fast-moving electrons.

Kerma, when applied to air, is equivalent to the legacy roentgen unit of radiation exposure, but there is a difference in the definition of these two units. The gray is defined independently of any target material, however, the roentgen was defined specifically by the ionisation effect in dry air, which did not necessarily represent the effect on other media.

== Development of the absorbed dose concept and the gray ==
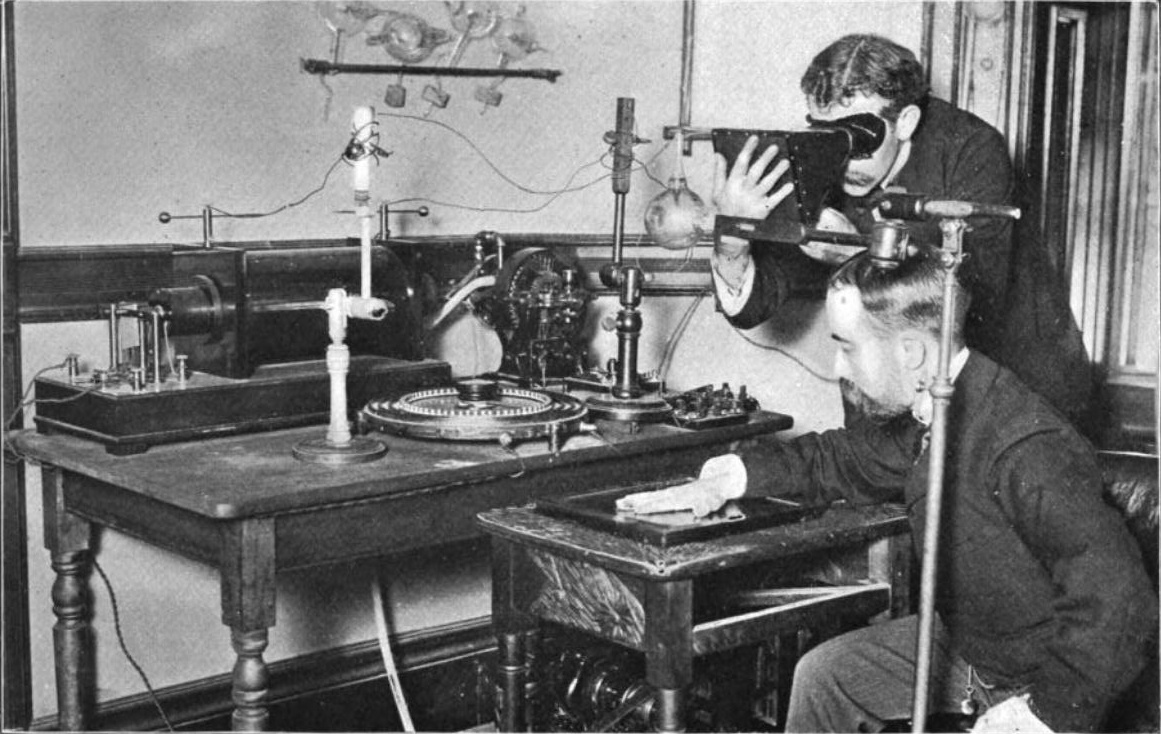
Using early Crookes tube X-Ray apparatus in 1896. One man is viewing his hand with a fluoroscope to optimise tube emissions, the other has his head close to the tube. No precautions against radiation exposure are being taken—‌its hazards were unknown at the time.

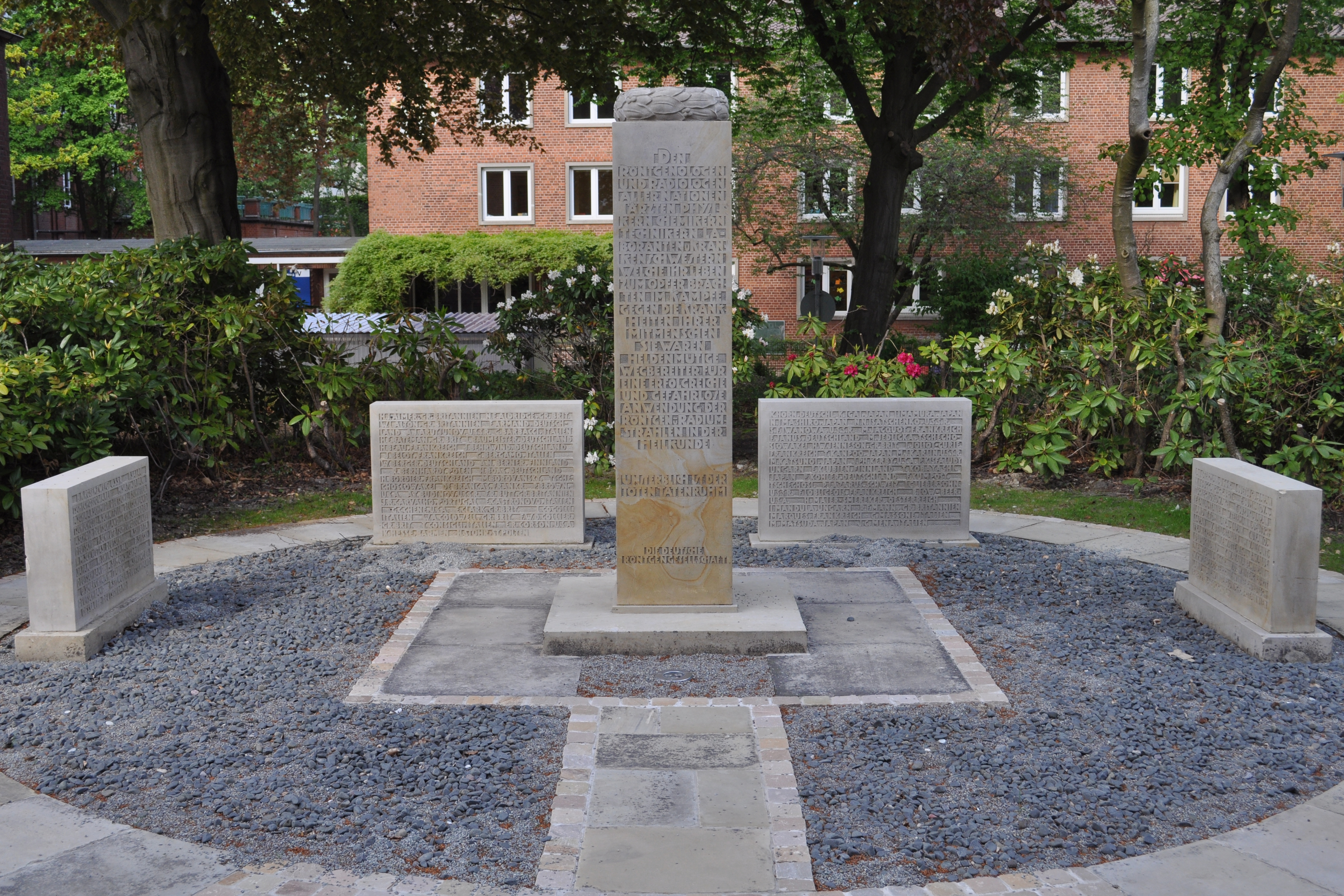
Monument to the X-ray and Radium Martyrs of All Nations erected 1936 at St. Georg hospital in Hamburg, commemorating 359 early radiology workers.

Wilhelm Röntgen discovered X-rays on November 8, 1895, and their use spread very quickly for medical diagnostics, particularly broken bones and embedded foreign objects where they were a revolutionary improvement over previous techniques.

Due to the wide use of X-rays and the growing realisation of the dangers of ionizing radiation, measurement standards became necessary for radiation intensity and various countries developed their own, but using differing definitions and methods. Eventually, in order to promote international standardisation, the first International Congress of Radiology (ICR) meeting in London in 1925, proposed a separate body to consider units of measure. This was called the International Commission on Radiation Units and Measurements, or ICRU, (Note: Originally known as the International X-ray Unit Committee) and came into being at the Second ICR in Stockholm in 1928, under the chairmanship of Manne Siegbahn. (Note: The host country nominated the chairman of the early ICRU meetings.)

One of the earliest techniques of measuring the intensity of X-rays was to measure their ionising effect in air by means of an air-filled ion chamber. At the first ICRU meeting it was proposed that one unit of X-ray dose should be defined as the quantity of X-rays that would produce one esu of charge in one cubic centimetre of dry air at 0 °C and 1 standard atmosphere of pressure. This unit of radiation exposure was named the roentgen in honour of Wilhelm Röntgen, who had died five years previously. At the 1937 meeting of the ICRU, this definition was extended to apply to gamma radiation. This approach, although a great step forward in standardisation, had the disadvantage of not being a direct measure of the absorption of radiation, and thereby the ionisation effect, in various types of matter including human tissue, and was a measurement only of the effect of the X-rays in a specific circumstance; the ionisation effect in dry air.

In 1940, Louis Harold Gray, who had been studying the effect of neutron damage on human tissue, together with William Valentine Mayneord and the radiobiologist John Read, published a paper in which a new unit of measure, dubbed the gram roentgen (symbol: gr) was proposed, and defined as "that amount of neutron radiation which produces an increment in energy in unit volume of tissue equal to the increment of energy produced in unit volume of water by one roentgen of radiation". This unit was found to be equivalent to 88 ergs in air, and made the absorbed dose, as it subsequently became known, dependent on the interaction of the radiation with the irradiated material, not just an expression of radiation exposure or intensity, which the roentgen represented. In 1953 the ICRU recommended the rad, equal to 100 erg/g, as the new unit of measure of absorbed radiation. The rad was expressed in coherent cgs units.

In the late 1950s, the CGPM invited the ICRU to join other scientific bodies to work on the development of the International System of Units, or SI. The CCU decided to define the SI unit of absorbed radiation as energy deposited by reabsorbed charged particles per unit mass of absorbent material, which is how the rad had been defined, but in MKS units it would be equivalent to the joule per kilogram. This was confirmed in 1975 by the 15th CGPM, and the unit was named the "gray" in honour of Louis Harold Gray, who had died in 1965. The gray was thus equal to 100 rad. Notably, the centigray (numerically equivalent to the rad) is still widely used to describe absolute absorbed doses in radiotherapy.

The adoption of the gray by the 15th General Conference on Weights and Measures as the unit of measure of the absorption of ionizing radiation, specific energy absorption, and of kerma in 1975 was the culmination of over half a century of work, both in the understanding of the nature of ionizing radiation and in the creation of coherent radiation quantities and units.

== Radiation-related quantities ==
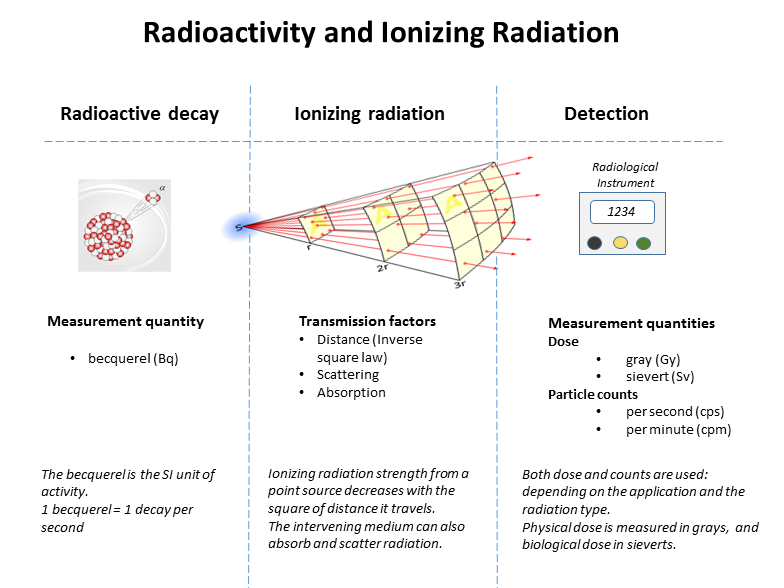
Graphic showing relationships between radioactivity and detected ionizing radiation at a point.

The following table shows radiation quantities in SI and non-SI units.

Ionizing radiation related quantities
Quantity	Unit	Symbol	Derivation	Year	SI equivalent
Activity (A)	becquerel	Bq	s^{−1}	1974	SI unit
Activity (A)	curie	Ci	3.7×10^{10} s^{−1}	1953	3.7×10^{10} Bq
Activity (A)	rutherford	Rd	10^{6} s^{−1}	1946	1000000 Bq
Exposure (X)	coulomb per kilogram	C/kg	C⋅kg^{−1} of air	1974	SI unit
Exposure (X)	röntgen	R	esu / 0.001293 g of air	1928	2.58×10^{−4} C/kg
Absorbed dose (D)	gray	Gy	J⋅kg^{−1}	1974	SI unit
Absorbed dose (D)	erg per gram	erg/g	erg⋅g^{−1}	1950	1.0×10^{−4} Gy
Absorbed dose (D)	rad	rad	100 erg⋅g^{−1}	1953	0.010 Gy
Equivalent dose (H)	sievert	Sv	J⋅kg^{−1} × W_{R}	1977	SI unit
Equivalent dose (H)	röntgen equivalent man	rem	100 erg⋅g^{−1} × W_{R}	1971	0.010 Sv
Effective dose (E)	sievert	Sv	J⋅kg^{−1} × W_{R} × W_{T}	1977	SI unit
Effective dose (E)	röntgen equivalent man	rem	100 erg⋅g^{−1} × W_{R} × W_{T}	1971	0.010 Sv

== See also ==
- Dose area product – Quantity used to assess X radiation risk (Gy·cm^{2})
- International System of Units – Modern form of the metric system (SI base units)
- Orders of magnitude (radiation) – Comparison of a wide range of radiation dosages
- Order of magnitude (unit) – Scale of numbers with a fixed ratio
- Rad (radiation unit) – Non-SI unit measuring absorbed dose of ionizing radiation
- Roentgen (unit) – Measurement of radiation exposure
  - Roentgen equivalent man – Radiation unit
- Sievert, SI derived unit of dose equivalent radiation
  - SI derived unit – Measurement unit derived from basic metric value
