= TBQ =

TBQ or tbq may refer to:

- Taunsa Barrage railway station (Station code: TBQ), Pakistan
- Tibeto-Burman languages (ISO 639-3: tbq), the non-Sinitic members of the Sino-Tibetan language family
- Terabecquerel (TBq), a unit of radioactivity
