= Roentgen (unit) =

Measurement of radiation exposure

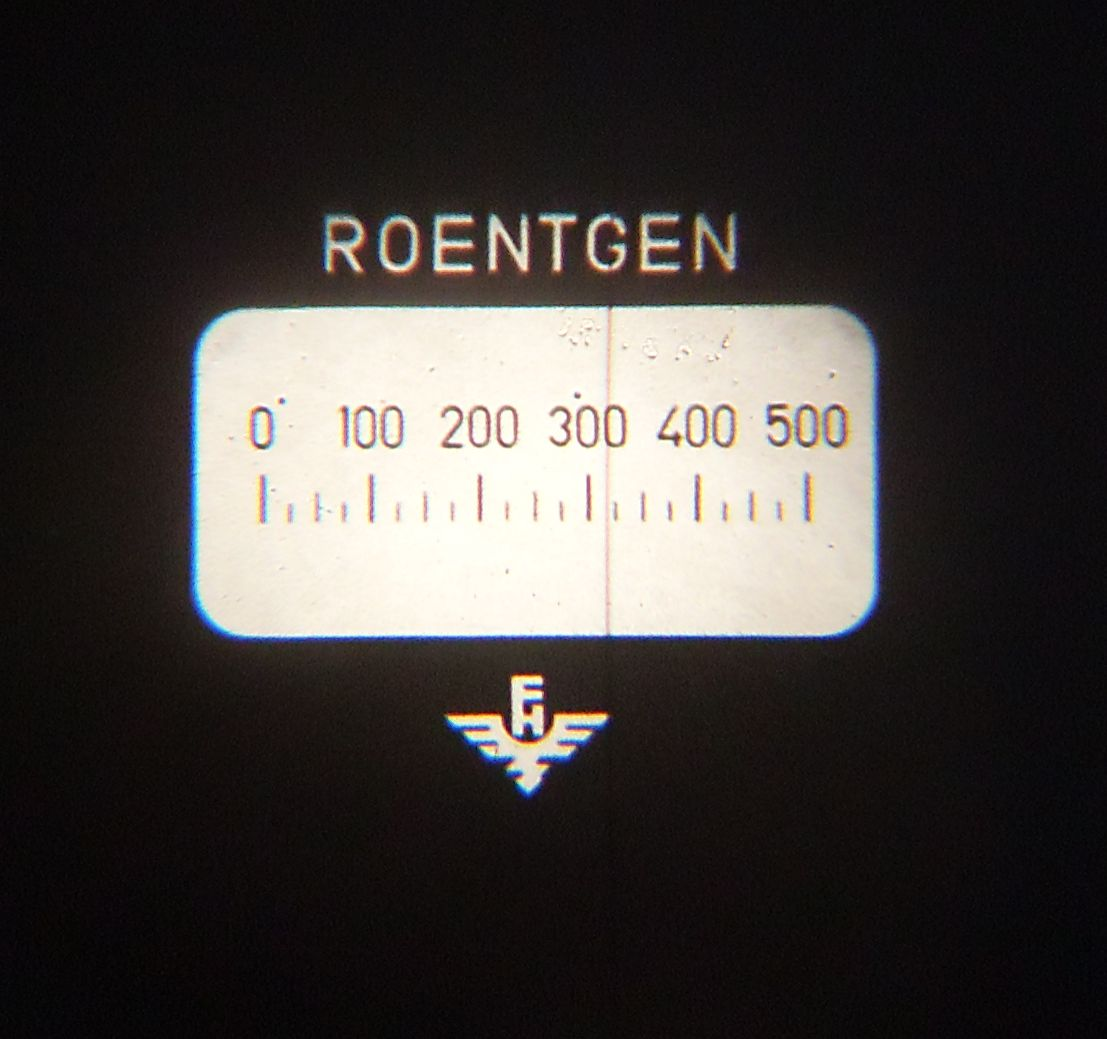
- Display of quartz fiber dosimeter, in units of roentgen.

General information
- Unit system: Legacy unit
- Unit of: Exposure to ionizing radiation
- Symbol: R
- Named after: Wilhelm Röntgen

Conversions
1 R in ...	... is equal to ...
- SI base units: 2.58×10^{−4} A⋅s/kg

The roentgen or röntgen (/ˈrɛntɡən, -dʒən, ˈrʌnt-/; symbol R) is a legacy unit of measurement for the exposure of X-rays and gamma rays, and is defined as the electric charge freed by such radiation in a specified volume of air divided by the mass of that air (statcoulomb per kilogram). In 1928, it was adopted as the first international measurement quantity for ionizing radiation to be defined for radiation protection, as it was then the most easily replicated method of measuring air ionization by using ion chambers. It is named after the German physicist Wilhelm Röntgen, who discovered X-rays and was awarded the first Nobel Prize in Physics for the discovery.

However, although this was a major step forward in standardising radiation measurement, the roentgen has the disadvantage that it is only a measure of air ionisation, and not a direct measure of radiation absorption in other materials, such as different forms of human tissue. For instance, one roentgen deposits 0.00877 grays (0.877 rads) of absorbed dose in dry air, or 0.0096 Gy (0.96 rad) in soft tissue. One roentgen of X-rays may deposit anywhere from 0.01 to 0.04 Gy (1.0 to 4.0 rad) in bone depending on the beam energy.

As the science of radiation dosimetry developed, it was realised that the ionising effect, and hence tissue damage, was linked to the energy absorbed, not just radiation exposure. Consequently new radiometric units for radiation protection were defined which took this into account. In 1953 the International Commission on Radiation Units and Measurements (ICRU) recommended the rad, equal to 100 erg/g, as the unit of measure of the new radiation quantity absorbed dose. The rad was expressed in coherent cgs units. In 1975 the unit gray was named as the SI unit of absorbed dose. One gray is equal to 1 J/kg (i.e. 100 rad). Additionally, a new quantity, kerma, was defined for air ionisation as the exposure for instrument calibration, and from this the absorbed dose can be calculated using known coefficients for specific target materials. Today, for radiation protection, the modern units, absorbed dose for energy absorption and the equivalent dose (sievert) for stochastic effect, are overwhelmingly used, and the roentgen is rarely used. The International Committee for Weights and Measures (CIPM) has never accepted the use of the roentgen.

The roentgen has been redefined over the years. It was last defined by the U.S.'s National Institute of Standards and Technology (NIST) in 1998 as 2.58×10^{−4} C/kg, with a recommendation that the definition be given in every document where the roentgen is used.

== History ==
The roentgen has its roots in the Villard unit defined in 1908 by the American Roentgen Ray Society as "the quantity of radiation which liberates by ionisation one esu of electricity per cm^{3} of air under normal conditions of temperature and pressure." Using 1 esu ≈ 3.33564×10^{−10} C and the air density of ~1.293 kg/m^{3} at 0 °C and 101 kPa, this converts to 2.58 × 10^{−4} C/kg, which is the modern value given by NIST.

1 esu/cm^{3} × 3.33564 × 10^{−10} C/esu × 1,000,000 cm^{3}/m^{3} ÷ 1.293 kg/m^{3} = 2.58 × 10^{−4} C/kg

This definition was used under different names (e, R, and German unit of radiation) for the next 20 years. In the meantime, the French Roentgen was given a different definition which amounted to 0.444 German R.

=== ICR definitions ===
In 1928, the International Congress of Radiology (ICR) defined the roentgen as "the quantity of X-radiation which, when the secondary electrons are fully utilised and the wall effect of the chamber is avoided, produce in 1 cc of atmospheric air at 0 °C and 76 cm of mercury pressure such a degree of conductivity that 1 esu of charge is measured at saturation current." The stated cubic centimetre (1 cc) of air would have a mass of 1.293 mg at the conditions given, so in 1937 the ICR rewrote this definition in terms of this mass of air instead of volume, temperature and pressure. The 1937 definition was also extended to gamma rays, but later capped at 3 MeV in 1950.

=== GOST definition ===
The USSR all-union committee of standards (GOST) had meanwhile adopted a significantly different definition of the roentgen in 1934. GOST standard 7623 defined it as "the physical dose of X-rays which produces charges each of one electrostatic unit in magnitude per cm^{3} of irradiated volume in air at 0 °C and normal atmospheric pressure when ionization is complete." The distinction of physical dose from dose caused confusion, some of which may have led Cantrill and Parker report that the roentgen had become shorthand for 83 ergs per gram (0.0083 Gy) of tissue. They named this derivative quantity the roentgen equivalent physical (rep) to distinguish it from the ICR roentgen.

=== ICRP definition ===
The introduction of the roentgen measurement unit, which relied upon measuring the ionisation of air, replaced earlier less accurate practices that relied on timed exposure, film exposure, or fluorescence. This led the way to setting exposure limits, and the National Council on Radiation Protection and Measurements of the United States established the first formal dose limit in 1931 as 0.1 roentgen per day. The International X-ray and Radium Protection Committee, now known as the International Commission on Radiological Protection (ICRP) soon followed with a limit of 0.2 roentgen per day in 1934. In 1950, the ICRP reduced their recommended limit to 0.3 roentgen per week for whole-body exposure.

The International Commission on Radiation Units and Measurements (ICRU) took over the definition of the roentgen in 1950, defining it as "the quantity of X or γ-radiation such that the associated corpuscular emission per 0.001293 gram of air produces, in air, ions carrying 1 electrostatic unit of quantity of electricity of either sign." The 3 MeV cap was no longer part of the definition, but the degraded usefulness of this unit at high beam energies was mentioned in the accompanying text. In the meantime, the new concept of roentgen equivalent man (rem) had been developed.

Relation between some ionizing radiation units

Starting in 1957, the ICRP began to publish their recommendations in terms of rem, and the roentgen fell into disuse. The medical imaging community still has a need for ionization measurements, but they gradually converted to using C/kg as legacy equipment was replaced. The ICRU recommended redefining the roentgen to be exactly 2.58 × 10^{−4} C/kg in 1971.

=== European Union ===
In 1971 the European Economic Community, in Directive 71/354/EEC, catalogued the units of measure that could be used "for ... public health ... purposes". The directive included the curie, rad, rem, and roentgen as permissible units, but required that the use of the rad, rem and roentgen be reviewed before 31 December 1977. This document defined the roentgen as exactly 2.58 × 10^{−4} C/kg, as per the ICRU recommendation. Directive 80/181/EEC, published in December 1979, which replaced directive 71/354/EEC, explicitly catalogued the gray, becquerel, and sievert for this purpose and required that the curie, rad, rem and roentgen be phased out by 31 December 1985.

=== NIST definition ===
Today the roentgen is rarely used, and the International Committee for Weights and Measures (CIPM) never accepted the use of the roentgen. From 1977 to 1998, the US NIST's translations of the SI brochure stated that the CIPM temporarily accepted the use of the roentgen (and other radiology units) with SI units since 1969. However, the only related CIPM decision shown in the appendix are with regards to the curie in 1964. The NIST brochures defined the roentgen as 2.58 × 10^{−4} C/kg, to be employed with exposures of x or γ radiation, but did not state the medium to be ionized. The CIPM's current SI brochure does not list the roentgen (or any other units) as accepted for use with the SI. The US NIST clarified in 1998 that it was providing its own interpretations of the SI system, whereby it accepted the roentgen for use in the US with the SI, while recognizing that the CIPM did not. By then, the limitation to x and γ radiation had been dropped. NIST recommends defining the roentgen in every document where this unit is used. The continued use of the roentgen is strongly discouraged by the NIST.

== Development of replacement radiometric quantities ==
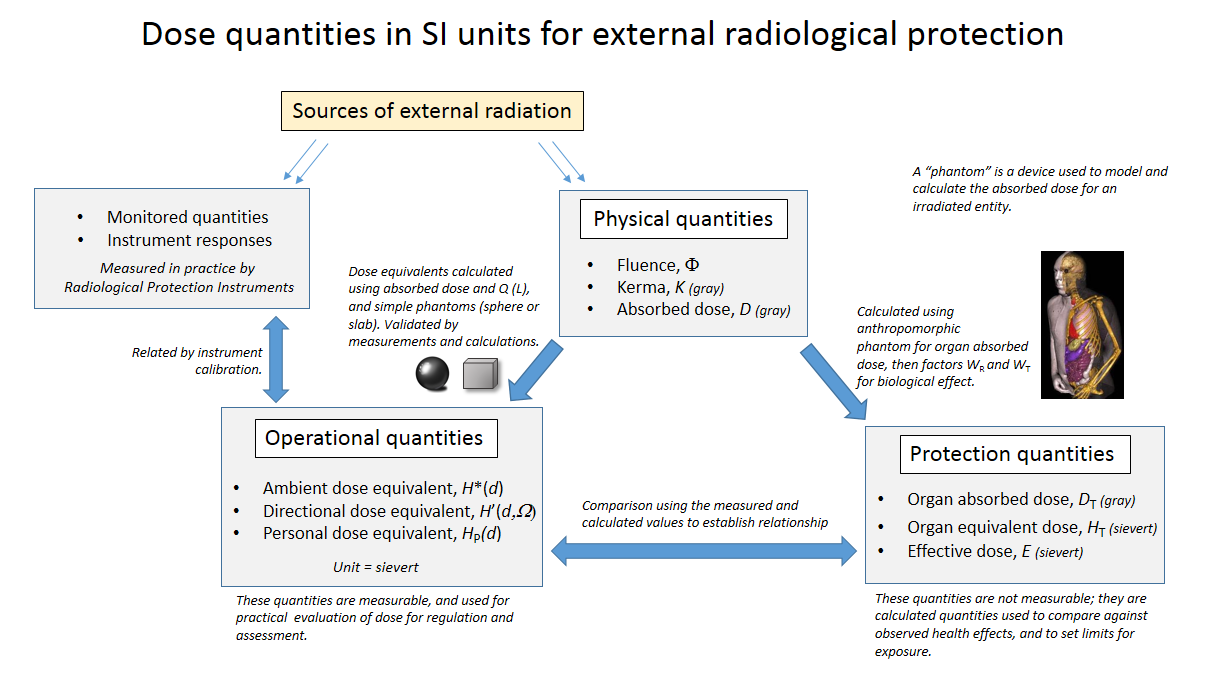
External modern radiation quantities used in radiological protection

Although a convenient quantity to measure with an air ion chamber, the roentgen had the disadvantage that it was not a direct measure of either the intensity of X-rays or their absorption, but rather was a measurement of the ionising effect of X-rays in a specific circumstance; which was dry air at 0 °C and 1 standard atmosphere of pressure.

Because of this the roentgen had a variable relationship to the amount of energy absorbed dose per unit mass in the target material, as different materials have different absorption characteristics. As the science of radiation dosimetry developed, this was seen as a serious shortcoming.

In 1940, Louis Harold Gray, who had been studying the effect of neutron damage on human tissue, together with William Valentine Mayneord and the radiobiologist John Read, published a paper in which a unit of measure, dubbed the "gram roentgen" (symbol: gr) defined as "that amount of neutron radiation which produces an increment in energy in unit volume of tissue equal to the increment of energy produced in unit volume of water by one roentgen of radiation" was proposed. This unit was found to be equivalent to 88 ergs in air. In 1953 the ICRU recommended the rad, equal to 100 erg/g, as the new unit of measure of absorbed radiation. The rad was expressed in coherent cgs units.

In the late 1950s the General Conference on Weights and Measures (CGPM) invited the ICRU to join other scientific bodies to work with the International Committee for Weights and Measures (CIPM) in the development of a system of units that could be used consistently over many disciplines. This body, initially known as the "Commission for the System of Units", renamed in 1964 as the "Consultative Committee for Units" (CCU), was responsible for overseeing the development of the International System of Units (SI). At the same time it was becoming increasingly obvious that the definition of the roentgen was unsound, and in 1962 it was redefined. The CCU decided to define the SI unit of absorbed radiation in terms of energy per unit mass, which in MKS units was J/kg. This was confirmed in 1975 by the 15th CGPM, and the unit was named the "gray" in honour of Louis Harold Gray, who had died in 1965. The gray was equal to 100 rad. The definition of the roentgen had had the attraction of being relatively simple to define for photons in air, but the gray is independent of the primary ionizing radiation type, and can be used for both kerma and absorbed dose in a wide range of matter.

When measuring absorbed dose in a human due to external exposure, the SI unit the gray, or the related non-SI rad are used. From these can be developed the dose equivalents to consider biological effects from differing radiation types and target materials. These are equivalent dose, and effective dose for which the SI unit sievert or the non-SI rem are used.

== Radiation-related quantities ==
The following table shows radiation quantities in SI and non-SI units:

Ionizing radiation related quantities
Quantity	Unit	Symbol	Derivation	Year	SI equivalent
Activity (A)	becquerel	Bq	s^{−1}	1974	SI unit
Activity (A)	curie	Ci	3.7×10^{10} s^{−1}	1953	3.7×10^{10} Bq
Activity (A)	rutherford	Rd	10^{6} s^{−1}	1946	1000000 Bq
Exposure (X)	coulomb per kilogram	C/kg	C⋅kg^{−1} of air	1974	SI unit
Exposure (X)	röntgen	R	esu / 0.001293 g of air	1928	2.58×10^{−4} C/kg
Absorbed dose (D)	gray	Gy	J⋅kg^{−1}	1974	SI unit
Absorbed dose (D)	erg per gram	erg/g	erg⋅g^{−1}	1950	1.0×10^{−4} Gy
Absorbed dose (D)	rad	rad	100 erg⋅g^{−1}	1953	0.010 Gy
Equivalent dose (H)	sievert	Sv	J⋅kg^{−1} × W_{R}	1977	SI unit
Equivalent dose (H)	röntgen equivalent man	rem	100 erg⋅g^{−1} × W_{R}	1971	0.010 Sv
Effective dose (E)	sievert	Sv	J⋅kg^{−1} × W_{R} × W_{T}	1977	SI unit
Effective dose (E)	röntgen equivalent man	rem	100 erg⋅g^{−1} × W_{R} × W_{T}	1971	0.010 Sv

== See also ==
- Gray (unit) – SI unit of absorbed dose
- Orders of magnitude (radiation)
- Rad (unit) – cgs unit of absorbed dose
- Roentgen equivalent man, or rem – a unit of radiation dose equivalent
- Sievert (symbol: Sv) – the SI derived unit of dose equivalent
- Wilhelm Röntgen
