= Curie (unit) =

Non-SI unit of radioactivity

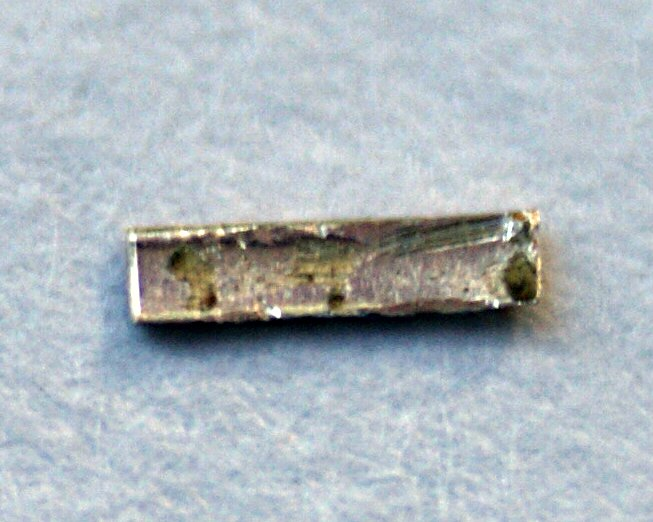
- A sample of radium, the element which was used in the original definition of the curie.

General information
- Unit of: Activity
- Symbol: Ci
- Named after: Pierre Curie and Marie Curie

Conversions
1 Ci in ...	... is equal to ...
- rutherfords: 37000 Rd
- SI derived unit: 37 GBq
- SI base unit: 3.7×10^{10} s^{−1}

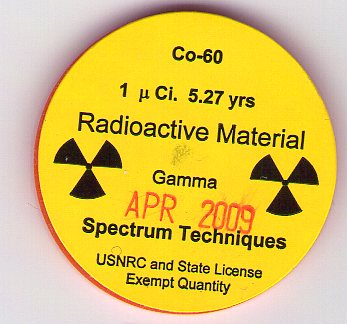
Sample of cobalt-60 that emits 1 μCi (microcurie) of radioactivity; i.e. 37,000 decays per second.

The curie (symbol Ci) is a non-SI unit of radioactivity originally defined in 1910. According to a notice in Nature at the time, it was to be named in honour of Pierre Curie, but was considered at least by some to be in honour of Marie Skłodowska-Curie as well, and is in later literature considered to be named for both.

In 1910, it was originally defined as "the quantity or mass of radium emanation in equilibrium with one gram of radium (element)". In modern terms, 1 curie is the mass of Radon-222 in secular equilibrium with 1 gram of Radium-226.

In 1964 was redefined as 1 Ci = 3.7×10^{10} decays per second after more accurate measurements of the activity of ^{226}Ra (which has a specific activity of 3.66×10^{10} Bq/g).

In 1975 the General Conference on Weights and Measures gave the becquerel (Bq), defined as one nuclear decay per second, official status as the SI unit of activity. Therefore:

1 Ci = 3.7×10^{10} Bq = 37 GBq

and

1 Bq ≅ 2.703×10^{−11} Ci ≅ 27 pCi

While its continued use is discouraged by the National Institute of Standards and Technology (NIST) and other bodies, the curie is still widely used throughout government, industry and medicine in the United States and in other countries.

At the 1910 meeting, which originally defined the curie, it was proposed to make it equivalent to 10 nanograms of radium (a practical amount). But Marie Curie, after initially accepting this, changed her mind and insisted on one gram of radium. According to Bertram Boltwood, Marie Curie thought that "the use of the name 'curie' for so infinitesimally small [a] quantity of anything was altogether inappropriate".

The power emitted in radioactive decay corresponding to one curie can be calculated by multiplying the decay energy by approximately 5.93 mW / MeV.

A radiotherapy machine may have roughly 1000 Ci of a radioisotope such as caesium-137 or cobalt-60. This quantity of radioactivity can produce serious health effects with only a few minutes of close-range, unshielded exposure.

Radioactive decay can lead to the emission of particulate radiation or electromagnetic radiation. Ingesting even small quantities of some particulate emitting radionuclides may be fatal. For example, the median lethal dose (LD-50) for ingested polonium-210 is 240 μCi; about 53.5 nanograms.

The typical human body contains roughly 0.1 μCi (14 mg) of naturally occurring potassium-40. A human body containing 16 kg (35 lb) of carbon (see Composition of the human body) would also have about 24 nanograms or 0.1 μCi of carbon-14. Together, these would result in a total of approximately 0.2 μCi or 7400 decays per second inside the person's body (mostly from beta decay but some from gamma decay).

== As a measure of quantity ==
Relation between some ionizing radiation units

Units of activity (the curie and the becquerel) also refer to a quantity of radioactive atoms. Because the probability of decay is a fixed physical quantity, for a known number of atoms of a particular radionuclide, a predictable number will decay in a given time. The number of decays that will occur in one second in one gram of atoms of a particular radionuclide is known as the specific activity of that radionuclide.

The activity of a sample decreases with time because of decay.

The rules of radioactive decay may be used to convert activity to an actual number of atoms. They state that 1 Ci of radioactive atoms would follow the expression

N (atoms) × λ (s^{−1}) = 1 Ci = 3.7 × 10^{10} Bq,

and so

N = 3.7 × 10^{10} Bq / λ,

where λ is the decay constant in s^{−1}.

Here are some examples, ordered by half-life:

Nuclide	Isotopic mass (Da)	Number of atoms in 1 gram	Half-life (Note: Note that NUBASE2020 uses the tropical year to convert between years and other units of time, not the Gregorian year. The relationship between years and other time units in NUBASE2020 is as follows: 1 y = 365.2422 d = 31 556 926 s)	Specific activity (Ci/g)	Mass of 1 curie
^{209}Bi	208.9803986	2.8816773×10^{21}	2.01×10^{19} years	8.51×10^{−17}	11.7 billion tonnes
^{190}Pt	189.9599498	3.1702160×10^{21}	4.83×10^{11} years	3.90×10^{−9}	257 tonnes
^{147}Sm	146.9149044	4.0990673×10^{21}	1.066×10^{11} years	2.28×10^{−8}	43.8 tonnes
^{232}Th	232.0380536	2.5953246×10^{21}	1.405×10^{10} years	1.10×10^{−7} (0.110 μCi/g)	9.12 tonnes
^{238}U	238.0507876	2.5297714×10^{21}	4.468×10^{9} years	3.36×10^{−7} (0.336 μCi/g)	2.98 tonnes
^{40}K	39.96399817	1.50689146×10^{22}	1.248×10^{9} years	7.18×10^{−6} (7.17 μCi/g)	140 kg
^{235}U	235.0439281	2.5621342×10^{21}	7.038×10^{8} years	2.16×10^{−6} (2.16 μCi/g)	463 kg
^{129}I	128.9049836	4.6717672×10^{21}	1.614×10^{7} years	1.72×10^{−4} (172 μCi/g)	5.82 kg
^{99}Tc	98.90624968	6.0887363×10^{21}	2.111×10^{5} years	1.71×10^{−4}	58.4 g
^{239}Pu	239.0521616	2.5191744×10^{21}	2.411×10^{4} years	6.20×10^{−2}	16.1 g
^{240}Pu	240.0538117	2.5086628×10^{21}	6561 years	0.227	4.41 g
^{14}C	14.00324199	4.30053323×10^{22}	5700 years	4.48	223 mg
^{226}Ra	226.0254082	2.6643645×10^{21}	1600 years	0.989	1.01 g
^{241}Am	241.0568273	2.4982245×10^{21}	432.6 years	3.43	292 mg
^{238}Pu	238.0495582	2.5297845×10^{21}	87.7 years	17.1	58.4 mg
^{137}Cs	136.9070893	4.3987063×10^{21}	30.04 years	86.9	11.5 mg
^{90}Sr	89.9077279	6.6981347×10^{21}	28.91 years	138	7.27 mg
^{241}Pu	241.0568497	2.4982243×10^{21}	14.329 years	104	9.66 mg
^{3}H	3.016049281320	1.996698393×10^{23}	12.32 years	9.62×10^{3}	104 μg
^{228}Ra	228.0310686	2.6409299×10^{21}	5.75 years	273	3.67 mg
^{60}Co	59.93381554	1.00479849×10^{22}	5.2714 years	1.13×10^{3}	884 μg
^{210}Po	209.9828737	2.8679200×10^{21}	138.376 days	4.49×10^{3}	223 μg
^{131}I	130.9061264	4.6003506×10^{21}	8.0249 days	1.24×10^{5}	8.05 μg
^{123}I	122.9055898	4.8998103×10^{21}	13.2232 hours	1.93×10^{6}	519 ng
^{212}Pb	211.9918959	2.8407410×10^{21}	10.627 hours	1.39×10^{6}	719 ng
^{223}Fr	223.0197342	2.7002726×10^{21}	22.00 minutes	3.83×10^{7}	26.1 ng
^{212}Po	211.9888680	2.8407816×10^{21}	294.4 nanoseconds	1.81×10^{17}	5.53 ag

== Radiation related quantities ==
The following table shows radiation quantities in SI and non-SI units:

Ionizing radiation related quantities
Quantity	Unit	Symbol	Derivation	Year	SI equivalent
Activity (A)	becquerel	Bq	s^{−1}	1974	SI unit
Activity (A)	curie	Ci	3.7×10^{10} s^{−1}	1953	3.7×10^{10} Bq
Activity (A)	rutherford	Rd	10^{6} s^{−1}	1946	1000000 Bq
Exposure (X)	coulomb per kilogram	C/kg	C⋅kg^{−1} of air	1974	SI unit
Exposure (X)	röntgen	R	esu / 0.001293 g of air	1928	2.58×10^{−4} C/kg
Absorbed dose (D)	gray	Gy	J⋅kg^{−1}	1974	SI unit
Absorbed dose (D)	erg per gram	erg/g	erg⋅g^{−1}	1950	1.0×10^{−4} Gy
Absorbed dose (D)	rad	rad	100 erg⋅g^{−1}	1953	0.010 Gy
Equivalent dose (H)	sievert	Sv	J⋅kg^{−1} × W_{R}	1977	SI unit
Equivalent dose (H)	röntgen equivalent man	rem	100 erg⋅g^{−1} × W_{R}	1971	0.010 Sv
Effective dose (E)	sievert	Sv	J⋅kg^{−1} × W_{R} × W_{T}	1977	SI unit
Effective dose (E)	röntgen equivalent man	rem	100 erg⋅g^{−1} × W_{R} × W_{T}	1971	0.010 Sv

== See also ==
- Geiger counter
- Ionizing radiation
- Radiation burn
- Radiation exposure
- Radiation poisoning
- United Nations Scientific Committee on the Effects of Atomic Radiation
