= Rutherford (unit) =

Obsolete unit of radioactivity

rutherford
- Unit of: Activity
- Symbol: Rd
- Named after: Lord Ernest Rutherford

Conversions
1 Rd in ...	... is equal to ...
- curie: 2.703×10^{−5} Ci
- SI derived units: 1 MBq
- SI base units: 10^{6} s^{−1}

Relation between some ionising radiation units

The rutherford (symbol Rd) is a non-SI unit of radioactive decay. It is defined as the activity of a quantity of radioactive material in which one million nuclei decay per second. It is therefore equivalent to one megabecquerel, and one becquerel equals one microrutherford. One rutherford is equivalent to 2.7̅0̅2̅×10^{−5} curie, or 37000 rutherfords for one curie.

The unit was introduced in 1946. It was named after British/New Zealand physicist and Nobel laureate Lord Ernest Rutherford (Nobel Prize in 1908), who was an early leader in the study of atomic nucleus disintegrations. After the becquerel was introduced in 1975 as the SI unit for activity, the rutherford became obsolete, and it is no longer commonly used.

== Radiation related quantities ==
The following table shows radiation quantities in SI and non-SI units:

Ionizing radiation related quantities
Quantity	Unit	Symbol	Derivation	Year	SI equivalent
Activity (A)	becquerel	Bq	s^{−1}	1974	SI unit
Activity (A)	curie	Ci	3.7×10^{10} s^{−1}	1953	3.7×10^{10} Bq
Activity (A)	rutherford	Rd	10^{6} s^{−1}	1946	1000000 Bq
Exposure (X)	coulomb per kilogram	C/kg	C⋅kg^{−1} of air	1974	SI unit
Exposure (X)	röntgen	R	esu / 0.001293 g of air	1928	2.58×10^{−4} C/kg
Absorbed dose (D)	gray	Gy	J⋅kg^{−1}	1974	SI unit
Absorbed dose (D)	erg per gram	erg/g	erg⋅g^{−1}	1950	1.0×10^{−4} Gy
Absorbed dose (D)	rad	rad	100 erg⋅g^{−1}	1953	0.010 Gy
Equivalent dose (H)	sievert	Sv	J⋅kg^{−1} × W_{R}	1977	SI unit
Equivalent dose (H)	röntgen equivalent man	rem	100 erg⋅g^{−1} × W_{R}	1971	0.010 Sv
Effective dose (E)	sievert	Sv	J⋅kg^{−1} × W_{R} × W_{T}	1977	SI unit
Effective dose (E)	röntgen equivalent man	rem	100 erg⋅g^{−1} × W_{R} × W_{T}	1971	0.010 Sv
