= Sievert =

Derived SI unit of equivalent dose of ionizing radiation

sievert
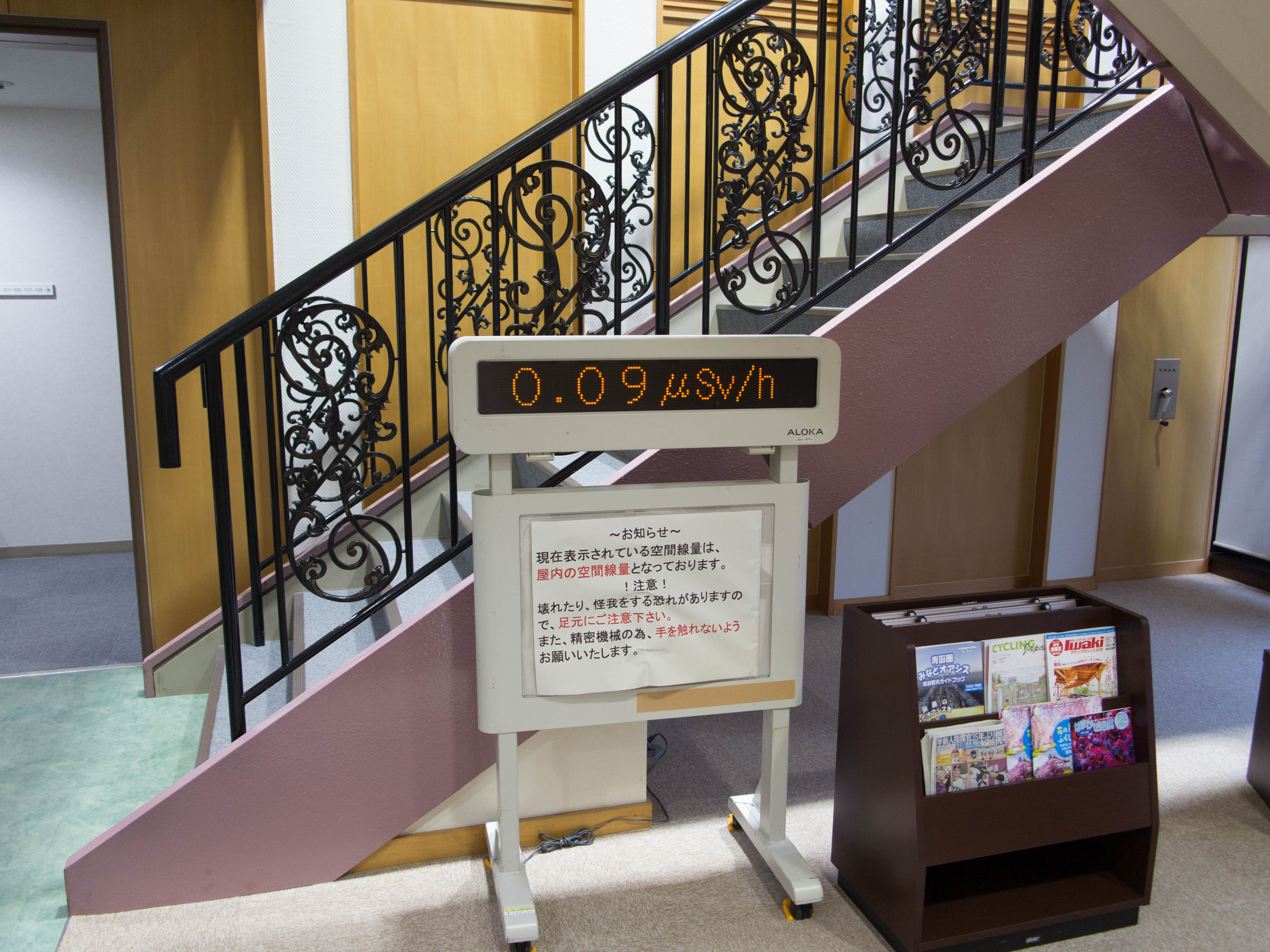
- Display of background radiation in a hotel at Naraha, Japan, showing dose rate in microsieverts per hour, five years after the Fukushima disaster

General information
- Unit system: SI
- Unit of: Stochastic health effect of ionizing radiation (equivalent dose)
- Symbol: Sv
- Named after: Rolf Maximilian Sievert

Conversions
1 Sv in ...	... is equal to ...
- SI base units: m^{2}⋅s^{−2}
- Sv indicates absorbed dose modified by weighting factors.: J⋅kg^{−1}
- CGS units (non-SI): 100 rem

The sievert (symbol: Sv (Note: Sv is also used by the non-SI units svedberg and sverdrup.)) is a derived unit in the International System of Units (SI) intended to represent the stochastic health risk of ionizing radiation, which is defined as the probability of causing radiation-induced cancer and genetic damage. The sievert is important in dosimetry and radiation protection. It is named after Rolf Maximilian Sievert, a Swedish medical physicist renowned for work on radiation dose measurement and research into the biological effects of radiation.

The sievert unit is used for radiation dose quantities such as equivalent dose and effective dose, which represent the risk of external radiation from sources outside the body, and committed dose, which represents the risk of internal irradiation due to inhaled or ingested radioactive substances. According to the International Commission on Radiological Protection (ICRP), one sievert results in a 5.5% probability of eventually developing fatal cancer based on the disputed linear no-threshold model of ionizing radiation exposure.

To calculate the value of stochastic health risk in sieverts, the physical quantity absorbed dose is converted into equivalent dose and effective dose by applying factors for radiation type and biological context, published by the ICRP and the International Commission on Radiation Units and Measurements (ICRU). One sievert equals 100 rem, which is an older, CGS radiation unit.

Conventionally, deterministic health effects due to acute tissue damage that is certain to happen, produced by high dose rates of radiation, are compared to the physical quantity absorbed dose measured by the unit gray (Gy).

== Definition ==
=== CIPM definition of the sievert ===
The SI definition given by the International Committee for Weights and Measures (CIPM) says:

"The quantity dose equivalent H is the product of the absorbed dose D of ionizing radiation and the dimensionless factor Q (quality factor) defined as a function of linear energy transfer by the ICRU"

H = Q × D

The value of Q is not defined further by CIPM, but it requires the use of the relevant ICRU recommendations to provide this value.

The CIPM also says that "in order to avoid any risk of confusion between the absorbed dose D and the dose equivalent H, the special names for the respective units should be used, that is, the name gray should be used instead of joules per kilogram for the unit of absorbed dose D and the name sievert instead of joules per kilogram for the unit of dose equivalent H".

In summary:

gray: quantity D—absorbed dose

1 Gy = 1 joule/kilogram—a physical quantity. 1 Gy is the deposit of a joule of radiation energy per kilogram of matter or tissue.

sievert: quantity H—equivalent dose

1 Sv = 1 joule/kilogram—a biological effect. The sievert represents the equivalent biological effect of the deposit of a joule of radiation energy in a kilogram of human tissue. The ratio to absorbed dose is denoted by Q.

=== ICRP definition of the sievert ===
The ICRP definition of the sievert is:

"The sievert is the special name for the SI unit of equivalent dose, effective dose, and operational dose quantities. The unit is joule per kilogram."

The sievert is used for a number of dose quantities which are described in this article and are part of the international radiological protection system devised and defined by the ICRP and ICRU.

== External dose quantities ==
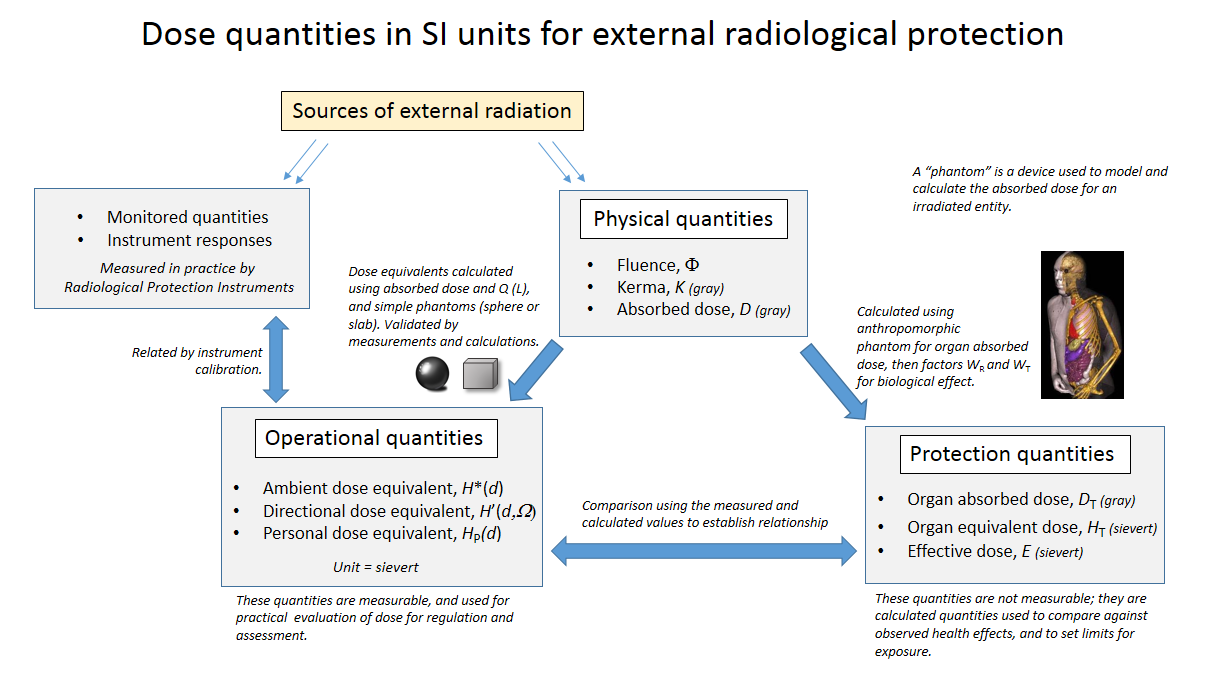
External radiation dose quantities used in radiological protection

When the sievert is used to represent the stochastic effects of external ionizing radiation on human tissue, the radiation doses received are measured in practice by radiometric instruments and dosimeters and are called operational quantities. To relate these actual received doses to likely health effects, protection quantities have been developed to predict the likely health effects using the results of large epidemiological studies. Consequently, this has required the creation of a number of different dose quantities within a coherent system developed by the ICRU working with the ICRP.

The external dose quantities and their relationships are shown in the accompanying diagram. The ICRU is primarily responsible for the operational dose quantities, based upon the application of ionising radiation metrology, and the ICRP is primarily responsible for the protection quantities, based upon modelling of dose uptake and biological sensitivity of the human body.

=== Naming conventions ===
The ICRU/ICRP dose quantities have specific purposes and meanings, but some use common words in a different order. There can be confusion between, for instance, equivalent dose and dose equivalent.

Although the CIPM definition states that the linear energy transfer function (Q) of the ICRU is used in calculating the biological effect, the ICRP in 1990 developed the "protection" dose quantities effective and equivalent dose which are calculated from more complex computational models and are distinguished by not having the phrase dose equivalent in their name. Only the operational dose quantities which still use Q for calculation retain the phrase dose equivalent. However, there are joint ICRU/ICRP proposals to simplify this system by changes to the operational dose definitions to harmonise with those of protection quantities. These were outlined at the 3rd International Symposium on Radiological Protection in October 2015, and if implemented would make the naming of operational quantities more logical by introducing "dose to lens of eye" and "dose to local skin" as equivalent doses.

In the USA there are differently named dose quantities which are not part of the ICRP nomenclature.

=== Physical quantities ===
These are directly measurable physical quantities in which no allowance has been made for biological effects. Radiation fluence is the number of radiation particles impinging per unit area per unit time, kerma is the ionising effect on air of gamma rays and X-rays and is used for instrument calibration, and absorbed dose is the amount of radiation energy deposited per unit mass in the matter or tissue under consideration.

=== Operational quantities ===
Operational quantities are measured in practice, and are the means of directly measuring dose uptake due to exposure, or predicting dose uptake in a measured environment. In this way they are used for practical dose control, by providing an estimate or upper limit for the value of the protection quantities related to an exposure. They are also used in practical regulations and guidance.

The calibration of individual and area dosimeters in photon fields is performed by measuring the collision "air kerma free in air" under conditions of secondary electron equilibrium. Then the appropriate operational quantity is derived applying a conversion coefficient that relates the air kerma to the appropriate operational quantity. The conversion coefficients for photon radiation are published by the ICRU.

Simple (non-anthropomorphic) "phantoms" are used to relate operational quantities to measured free-air irradiation. The ICRU sphere phantom is based on the definition of an ICRU 4-element tissue-equivalent material which does not really exist and cannot be fabricated. The ICRU sphere is a theoretical 30 cm diameter "tissue equivalent" sphere consisting of a material with a density of 1 g·cm^{−3} and a mass composition of 76.2% oxygen, 11.1% carbon, 10.1% hydrogen and 2.6% nitrogen. This material is specified to most closely approximate human tissue in its absorption properties. According to the ICRP, the ICRU "sphere phantom" in most cases adequately approximates the human body as regards the scattering and attenuation of penetrating radiation fields under consideration. Thus radiation of a particular energy fluence will have roughly the same energy deposition within the sphere as it would in the equivalent mass of human tissue.

To allow for back-scattering and absorption of the human body, the "slab phantom" is used to represent the human torso for practical calibration of whole body dosimeters. The slab phantom is 300 mm × 300 mm × 150 mm depth to represent the human torso.

The joint ICRU/ICRP proposals outlined at the 3rd International Symposium on Radiological Protection in October 2015 to change the definition of operational quantities would not change the present use of calibration phantoms or reference radiation fields.

=== Protection quantities ===
Protection quantities are calculated models, and are used as "limiting quantities" to specify exposure limits to ensure, in the words of ICRP, "that the occurrence of stochastic health effects is kept below unacceptable levels and that tissue reactions are avoided". These quantities cannot be measured in practice but their values are derived using models of external dose to internal organs of the human body, using anthropomorphic phantoms. These are 3D computational models of the body which take into account a number of complex effects such as body self-shielding and internal scattering of radiation. The calculation starts with organ absorbed dose, and then applies radiation and tissue weighting factors.

As protection quantities cannot practically be measured, operational quantities must be used to relate them to practical radiation instrument and dosimeter responses.

=== Instrument and dosimetry response ===
This is an actual reading obtained from such as an ambient dose gamma monitor, or a personal dosimeter. Such instruments are calibrated using radiation metrology techniques which will trace them to a national radiation standard, and thereby relate them to an operational quantity. The readings of instruments and dosimeters are used to prevent the uptake of excessive dose and to provide records of dose uptake to satisfy radiation safety legislation; such as in the UK, the Ionising Radiations Regulations 1999.

== Calculating protection dose quantities ==
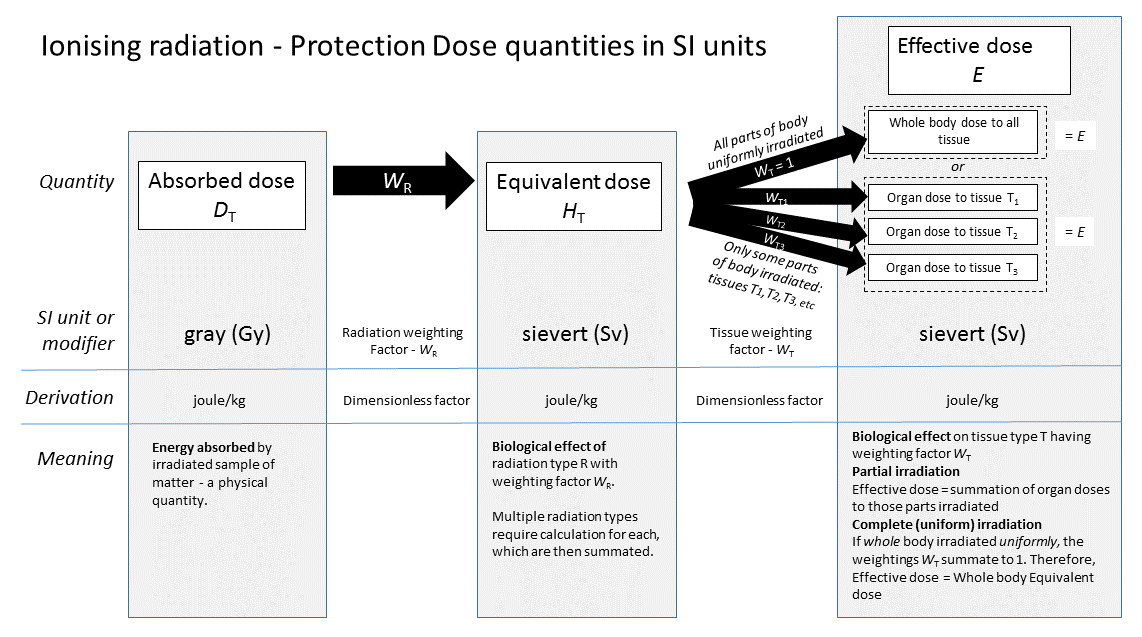
Graphic showing relationship of "protection dose" quantities in SI units

The sievert is used in external radiation protection for equivalent dose (the external-source, whole-body exposure effects, in a uniform field), and effective dose (which depends on the body parts irradiated).

These dose quantities are weighted averages of absorbed dose designed to be representative of the stochastic health effects of radiation, and use of the sievert implies that appropriate weighting factors have been applied to the absorbed dose measurement or calculation (expressed in grays).

The ICRP calculation provides two weighting factors to enable the calculation of protection quantities.

1. The radiation factor W_{R}, which is specific for radiation type R – This is used in calculating the equivalent dose H_{T} which can be for the whole body or for individual organs.
2. The tissue weighting factor W_{T}, which is specific for tissue type T being irradiated. This is used with W_{R} to calculate the contributory organ doses to arrive at an effective dose E for non-uniform irradiation.

When a whole body is irradiated uniformly only the radiation weighting factor W_{R} is used, and the effective dose equals the whole body equivalent dose. But if the irradiation of a body is partial or non-uniform the tissue factor W_{T} is used to calculate dose to each organ or tissue. These are then summed to obtain the effective dose. In the case of uniform irradiation of the human body, these summate to 1, but in the case of partial or non-uniform irradiation, they will summate to a lower value depending on the organs concerned; reflecting the lower overall health effect. The calculation process is shown on the accompanying diagram. This approach calculates the biological risk contribution to the whole body, taking into account complete or partial irradiation, and the radiation type or types.

The values of these weighting factors are conservatively chosen to be greater than the bulk of experimental values observed for the most sensitive cell types, based on averages of those obtained for the human population.

=== Radiation type weighting factor W_{R} ===
Since different radiation types have different biological effects for the same deposited energy, a corrective radiation weighting factor W_{R}, which is dependent on the radiation type and on the target tissue, is applied to convert the absorbed dose measured in the unit gray to determine the equivalent dose. The result is given the unit sievert.

Radiation weighting factors W_{R} used to represent relative biological effectiveness according to ICRP report 103
Radiation	Energy (E)	W_{R} (formerly Q)
x-rays, gamma rays, beta particles, muons		1
neutrons	< 1 MeV	2.5 + 18.2e^{−[ln(E)]^{2}/6}
neutrons	1 – 50 MeV	5.0 + 17.0e^{−[ln(2E)]^{2}/6}
neutrons	> 50 MeV	2.5 + 3.25e^{−[ln(0.04E)]^{2}/6}
protons, charged pions		2
alpha particles, nuclear fission products, heavy nuclei		20

The equivalent dose is calculated by multiplying the absorbed energy, averaged by mass over an organ or tissue of interest, by a radiation weighting factor appropriate to the type and energy of radiation. To obtain the equivalent dose for a mix of radiation types and energies, a sum is taken over all types of radiation energy dose.

$$H_T = \sum_R W_R \cdot D_{T,R},$$
where

H_{T} is the equivalent dose absorbed by tissue T,
D_{T,R} is the absorbed dose in tissue T by radiation type R and
W_{R} is the radiation weighting factor defined by regulation.

Thus for example, an absorbed dose of 1 Gy by alpha particles will lead to an equivalent dose of 20 Sv.

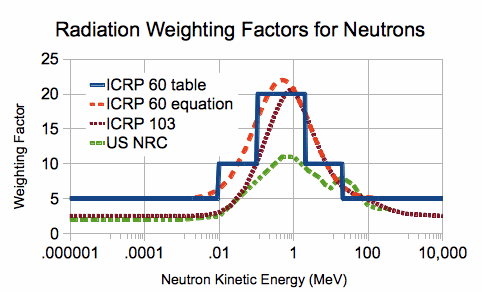
The radiation weighting factor for neutrons has been revised over time and remains controversial.

This may seem to be a paradox. It implies that the energy of the incident radiation field in joules has increased by a factor of 20, thereby violating the laws of conservation of energy. However, this is not the case. The sievert is used only to convey the fact that a gray of absorbed alpha particles would cause twenty times the biological effect of a gray of absorbed x-rays. It is this biological component that is being expressed when using sieverts rather than the actual energy delivered by the incident absorbed radiation.

=== Tissue type weighting factor W_{T} ===
The second weighting factor is the tissue factor W_{T}, but it is used only if there has been non-uniform irradiation of a body. If the body has been subject to uniform irradiation, the effective dose equals the whole body equivalent dose, and only the radiation weighting factor W_{R} is used. But if there is partial or non-uniform body irradiation the calculation must take account of the individual organ doses received, because the sensitivity of each organ to irradiation depends on their tissue type. This summed dose from only those organs concerned gives the effective dose for the whole body. The tissue weighting factor is used to calculate those individual organ dose contributions.

The ICRP values for W_{T} are given in the table shown here.

Weighting factors for different organs
Organs	Tissue weighting factors		
Organs	ICRP26 1977	ICRP60 1990	ICRP103 2007
Gonads	0.25	0.20	0.08
Red bone marrow	0.12	0.12	0.12
Colon	—	0.12	0.12
Lung	0.12	0.12	0.12
Stomach	—	0.12	0.12
Breasts	0.15	0.05	0.12
Bladder	—	0.05	0.04
Liver	—	0.05	0.04
Oesophagus	—	0.05	0.04
Thyroid	0.03	0.05	0.04
Skin	—	0.01	0.01
Bone surface	0.03	0.01	0.01
Salivary glands	—	—	0.01
Brain	—	—	0.01
Remainder of body	0.30	0.05	0.12
Total	1.00	1.00	1.00

The article on effective dose gives the method of calculation. The absorbed dose is first corrected for the radiation type to give the equivalent dose, and then corrected for the tissue receiving the radiation. Some tissues like bone marrow are particularly sensitive to radiation, so they are given a weighting factor that is disproportionally large relative to the fraction of body mass they represent. Other tissues like the hard bone surface are particularly insensitive to radiation and are assigned a disproportionally low weighting factor.

In summary, the sum of tissue-weighted doses to each irradiated organ or tissue of the body adds up to the effective dose for the body. The use of effective dose enables comparisons of overall dose received regardless of the extent of body irradiation.

Relation between some ionizing radiation units

== Operational quantities ==
The operational quantities are used in practical applications for monitoring and investigating external exposure situations. They are defined for practical operational measurements and assessment of doses in the body. Three external operational dose quantities were devised to relate operational dosimeter and instrument measurements to the calculated protection quantities. Also devised were two phantoms, The ICRU "slab" and "sphere" phantoms which relate these quantities to incident radiation quantities using the Q(L) calculation.

=== Ambient dose equivalent ===
This is used for area monitoring of penetrating radiation and is usually expressed as the quantity H*(10). This means the radiation is equivalent to that found 10 mm within the ICRU sphere phantom in the direction of origin of the field. An example of penetrating radiation is gamma rays.

=== Directional dose equivalent ===
This is used for monitoring of low penetrating radiation and is usually expressed as the quantity H'(0.07). This means the radiation is equivalent to that found at a depth of 0.07 mm in the ICRU sphere phantom. Examples of low penetrating radiation are alpha particles, beta particles and low-energy photons. This dose quantity is used for the determination of equivalent dose to such as the skin, lens of the eye. In radiological protection practice value of omega is usually not specified as the dose is usually at a maximum at the point of interest.

=== Personal dose equivalent ===
This is used for individual dose monitoring, such as with a personal dosimeter worn on the body. The recommended depth for assessment is 10 mm which gives the quantity H_{p}(10).

== Proposals for changing the definition of protection dose quantities ==
In order to simplify the means of calculating operational quantities and assist in the comprehension of radiation dose protection quantities, ICRP Committee 2 & ICRU Report Committee 26 started in 2010 an examination of different means of achieving this by dose coefficients related to Effective Dose or Absorbed Dose.

Specifically;

1. For area monitoring of effective dose of whole body it would be:

H = Φ × conversion coefficient

The driver for this is that H^{∗}(10) is not a reasonable estimate of effective dose due to high energy photons, as a result of the extension of particle types and energy ranges to be considered in ICRP report 116. This change would remove the need for the ICRU sphere and introduce a new quantity called E_{max}.

2. For individual monitoring, to measure deterministic effects on eye lens and skin, it would be:

D = Φ × conversion coefficient for absorbed dose.

The driver for this is the need to measure the deterministic effect, which it is suggested, is more appropriate than stochastic effect. This would calculate equivalent dose quantities H_{lens} and H_{skin}.

This would remove the need for the ICRU Sphere and the Q-L function. Any changes would replace ICRU report 51, and part of report 57.

A final draft report was issued in July 2017 by ICRU/ICRP for consultation.

== Internal dose quantities ==
The sievert is used for human internal dose quantities in calculating committed dose. This is dose from radionuclides which have been ingested or inhaled into the human body, and thereby "committed" to irradiate the body for a period of time. The concepts of calculating protection quantities as described for external radiation applies, but as the source of radiation is within the tissue of the body, the calculation of absorbed organ dose uses different coefficients and irradiation mechanisms.

The ICRP defines Committed effective dose, $E(t)$ as the sum of the products of the committed organ or tissue equivalent doses and the appropriate tissue weighting factors $W_t$, where $t$ is the integration time in years following the intake. The commitment period is taken to be 50 years for adults, and to age 70 years for children.

The ICRP further states "For internal exposure, committed effective doses are generally determined from an assessment of the intakes of radionuclides from bioassay measurements or other quantities (e.g., activity retained in the body or in daily excreta). The radiation dose is determined from the intake using recommended dose coefficients".

A committed dose from an internal source is intended to carry the same effective risk as the same amount of equivalent dose applied uniformly to the whole body from an external source, or the same amount of effective dose applied to part of the body.

== Health effects ==
Ionizing radiation has deterministic and stochastic effects on human health. Deterministic (acute tissue effect) events happen with certainty, with the resulting health conditions occurring in every individual who received the same high dose. Stochastic (cancer induction and genetic) events are inherently random, with most individuals in a group failing to ever exhibit any causal negative health effects after exposure, while an indeterministic random minority do, often with the resulting subtle negative health effects being observable only after large detailed epidemiology studies.

The use of the sievert implies that only stochastic effects are being considered, and to avoid confusion deterministic effects are conventionally compared to values of absorbed dose expressed by the SI unit gray (Gy).

=== Stochastic effects ===
Stochastic effects are those that occur randomly, such as radiation-induced cancer. The consensus of nuclear regulators, governments and the UNSCEAR is that the incidence of cancers due to ionizing radiation can be modeled as increasing linearly with effective dose at a rate of 5.5% per sievert. This is known as the linear no-threshold model (LNT model). Some argue that this LNT model is now outdated and should be replaced with a threshold below which the body's natural cell processes repair damage and/or replace damaged cells. There is general agreement that the risk is much higher for infants and fetuses than adults, higher for the middle-aged than for seniors, and higher for women than for men, though these differences have no quantitative consensus.

=== Deterministic effects ===
This is a graph depicting the effect of dose fractionation on the ability of gamma rays to cause cell death. The blue line is for cells which were not given a chance to recover; the radiation was delivered in one session. The red line is for cells which were allowed to stand for a time and recover with the pause in delivery conferring radioresistance.

The deterministic (acute tissue damage) effects that can lead to acute radiation syndrome only occur in the case of acute high doses (≳ 0.1 Gy) and high dose rates (≳ 0.1 Gy/h) and are conventionally not measured using the unit sievert, but use the unit gray (Gy). A model of deterministic risk would require different weighting factors (not yet established) than are used in the calculation of equivalent and effective dose.

=== ICRP dose limits ===
The ICRP recommends a number of limits for dose uptake in table 8 of report 103. These limits are "situational", for planned, emergency and existing situations. Within these situations, limits are given for the following groups:

- Planned exposure – limits given for occupational, medical and public
- Emergency exposure – limits given for occupational and public exposure
- Existing exposure – All persons exposed

For occupational exposure, the limit is 50 mSv in a single year with a maximum of 100 mSv in a consecutive five-year period, and for the public to an average of 1 mSv (0.001 Sv) of effective dose per year, not including medical and occupational exposures.

For comparison, natural radiation levels inside the United States Capitol are such that a human body would receive an additional dose rate of 0.85 mSv/a, close to the regulatory limit, because of the uranium content of the granite structure. According to the conservative ICRP model, someone who spent 20 years inside the capitol building would have an extra one in a thousand chance of getting cancer, over and above any other existing risk (calculated as: 20 a·0.85 mSv/a·0.001 Sv/mSv·5.5%/Sv ≈ 0.1%). However, that "existing risk" is much higher; an average American would have a 10% chance of getting cancer during this same 20-year period, even without any exposure to artificial radiation (see natural Epidemiology of cancer and cancer rates).

== Dose examples ==
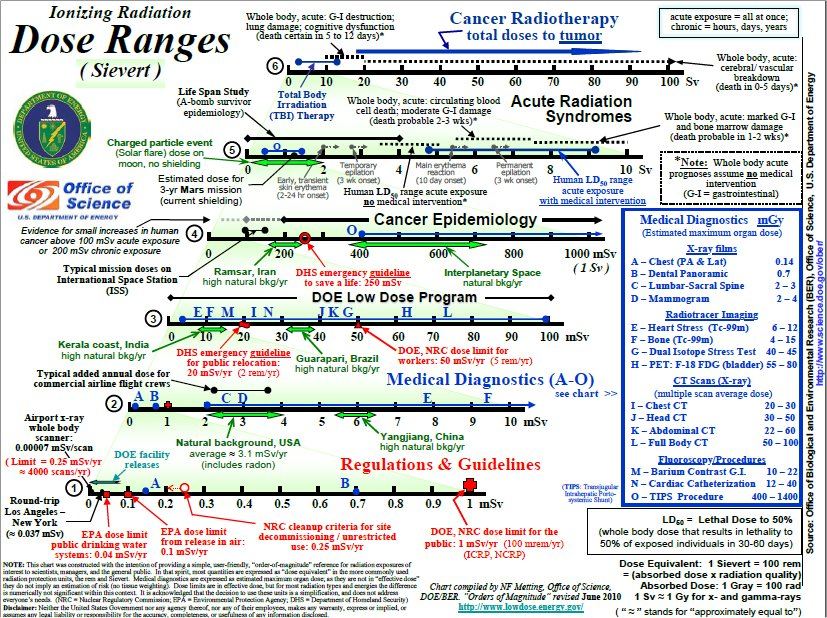
US Department of Energy 2010 dose chart in sieverts for a variety of situations and applications

Various doses of radiation in sieverts, ranging from trivial to lethal, expressed as comparative areas

Comparison of radiation doses – includes the amount detected on the trip from Earth to Mars by the RAD on the MSL (2011–2013).

Significant radiation doses are not frequently encountered in everyday life. The following examples can help illustrate relative magnitudes; these are meant to be examples only, not a comprehensive list of possible radiation doses. An "acute dose" is one that occurs over a short and finite period of time, while a "chronic dose" is a dose that continues for an extended period of time so that it is better described by a dose rate.

=== Dose examples ===
98	nSv:	Banana equivalent dose, an illustrative unit of radiation dose representing the measure of radiation from a typical 150 g banana (Note: Noted figures are dominated by a committed dose which gradually turned into effective dose over an extended period of time. Therefore the true acute dose must be lower, but standard dosimetry practice is to account committed doses as acute in the year the radioisotopes are taken into the body.)
250	nSv:	U.S. limit on effective dose for general-use x-ray security screening systems such as those previously used in airport security screening
5–10	μSv:	One set of dental radiographs
80	μSv:	Average (one time) dose to people living within 10 mi (16 km) of the plant during the Three Mile Island accident
400–600	μSv:	Two-view mammogram, using weighting factors updated in 2007
1	mSv:	U.S. 10 CFR § 20.1301(a)(1) dose limit for individual members of the public, total effective dose equivalent, per annum
1.5–1.7	mSv:	Annual occupational dose for flight attendants
2–7	mSv:	Barium fluoroscopy, e.g. Barium meal, up to 2 minutes, 4–24 spot images
10–30	mSv:	Single full-body CT scan
50	mSv:	U.S. 10 C.F.R. § 20.1201(a)(1)(i) occupational dose limit, total effective dose equivalent, per annum
68	mSv:	Estimated maximum dose to evacuees who lived closest to the Fukushima I nuclear accidents
80	mSv:	6-month stay on the International Space Station
160	mSv:	Chronic dose to lungs over one year smoking 1.5 packs of cigarettes per day, mostly due to inhalation of Polonium-210 and Lead-210
250	mSv:	6-month trip to Mars—radiation due to cosmic rays, which are very difficult to shield against
400	mSv:	Average accumulated exposure of residents over a period of 9–20 years, who suffered no ill effects, in apartments in Taiwan constructed with rebar containing Cobalt-60
500	mSv:	The U.S. 10 C.F.R. § 20.1201(a)(2)(ii) occupational dose limit, shallow-dose equivalent to skin, per annum
670	mSv:	Highest dose received by a worker responding to the Fukushima emergency
1	Sv:	Maximum allowed radiation exposure for NASA astronauts over their career
4–5	Sv:	Dose required to kill a human with a 50% risk within 30 days (LD_{50}/30), if the dose is received over a very short duration
5	Sv:	Calculated dose from the neutron and gamma ray flash, 1.2 km from ground zero of the Little Boy fission bomb, air burst at 600 m.
4.5–6	Sv:	Fatal acute doses during Goiânia accident
5.1	Sv:	Fatal acute dose to Harry Daghlian in 1945 criticality accident
10 to 17	Sv:	Fatal acute doses during Tokaimura nuclear accident. Hisashi Ouchi who received 17 Sv lived for 83 days after the accident.
21	Sv:	Fatal acute dose to Louis Slotin in 1946 criticality accident
36	Sv:	Fatal acute dose to Cecil Kelley in 1958, death occurred within 35 hours.
54	Sv:	Fatal acute dose to Boris Korchilov in 1961 after a reactor cooling system failed on the Soviet submarine K-19 which required work in the reactor with no shielding
64	Sv:	Nonfatal dose to Albert Stevens spread over ≈21 years, due to a 1945 plutonium injection experiment by doctors working on the secret Manhattan Project.

=== Dose rate examples ===
All conversions between hours and years have assumed continuous presence in a steady field, disregarding known fluctuations, intermittent exposure and radioactive decay. Converted values are shown in parentheses. "/a" is "per annum", which means per year. "/h" means "per hour".

<1	mSv/a	<100	nSv/h	Steady dose rates below 100 nSv/h are difficult to measure.
1	mSv/a	(100	nSv/h avg)	ICRP recommended maximum for external irradiation of the human body, excluding medical and occupational exposures.
2.4	mSv/a	(270	nSv/h avg)	Human exposure to natural background radiation, global average
(8	mSv/a)	810	nSv/h avg	Next to the Chernobyl New Safe Confinement (May 2019)
~8	mSv/a	(~900	nSv/h avg)	Average natural background radiation in Finland
24	mSv/a	(2.7	μSv/h avg)	Natural background radiation at airline cruise altitude (Note: The dose rate received by air crews is highly dependent on the radiation weighting factors chosen for protons and neutrons, which have changed over time and remain controversial.)
(46	mSv/a)	5.19	μSv/h avg	Next to Chernobyl Nuclear Power Plant, before installing the New Sarcophagus in November 2016
130	mSv/a	(15	μSv/h avg)	Ambient field inside most radioactive house in Ramsar, Iran (Note: Noted figures exclude any committed dose from radioisotopes taken into the body. Therefore the total radiation dose would be higher unless respiratory protection was used.)
(350	mSv/a)	39.8	μSv/h avg	Inside "The Claw" of Chernobyl
(800	mSv/a)	90	μSv/h	Natural radiation on a monazite beach near Guarapari, Brazil.
(9	Sv/a)	1	mSv/h	NRC definition of a high radiation area in a nuclear power plant, warranting a chain-link fence
(17–173	Sv/a)	2–20	mSv/h	Typical dose rate for activated reactor wall in possible future fusion reactors after 100 years. After approximately 300 years of decay the fusion waste would produce the same dose rate as exposure to coal ash, with the volume of fusion waste naturally being orders of magnitude less than from coal ash. Immediate predicted activation is 90 MGy/a.
(1.7	kSv/a)	190	mSv/h	Highest reading from fallout of the Trinity bomb, 20 mi (32 km) away, 3 hours after detonation.
(2.3	MSv/a)	270	Sv/h	Typical PWR spent fuel waste, after 10-year cooldown, no shielding and no distance.
(4.6–5.6	MSv/a)	530–650	Sv/h	The radiation level inside the primary containment vessel of the second BWR-reactor of the Fukushima power station, in February 2017, six years after a suspected meltdown. In this environment, it takes between 22 and 34 seconds to accumulate a median lethal dose (LD_{50}/30).

Notes on examples:

== History ==
The sievert has its origin in the röntgen equivalent man (rem) which was derived from CGS units. The International Commission on Radiation Units and Measurements (ICRU) promoted a switch to coherent SI units in the 1970s, and announced in 1976 that it planned to formulate a suitable unit for equivalent dose. The ICRP pre-empted the ICRU by introducing the sievert in 1977.

The sievert was adopted by the International Committee for Weights and Measures (CIPM) in 1980, five years after adopting the gray. The CIPM then issued an explanation in 1984, recommending when the sievert should be used as opposed to the gray. That explanation was updated in 2002 to bring it closer to the ICRP's definition of equivalent dose, which had changed in 1990. Specifically, the ICRP had introduced equivalent dose, renamed the quality factor (Q) to radiation weighting factor (W_{R}), and dropped another weighting factor "N" in 1990. In 2002, the CIPM similarly dropped the weighting factor "N" from their explanation but otherwise kept other old terminology and symbols. This explanation only appears in the appendix to the SI brochure and is not part of the definition of the sievert.

== Common SI usage ==
The sievert is named after Rolf Maximilian Sievert. As with every SI unit named after a person, its symbol starts with an upper case letter (Sv), but when written in full, it follows the rules for capitalisation of a common noun; i.e., sievert becomes capitalised at the beginning of a sentence and in titles but is otherwise in lower case.

Frequently used SI prefixes are the millisievert (1 mSv = 0.001 Sv) and microsievert (1 μSv = 0.000 001 Sv) and commonly used units for time derivative or "dose rate" indications on instruments and warnings for radiological protection are μSv/h and mSv/h. Regulatory limits and chronic doses are often given in units of mSv/a or Sv/a, where they are understood to represent an average over the entire year. In many occupational scenarios, the hourly dose rate might fluctuate to levels thousands of times higher for a brief period of time, without infringing on the annual limits. The conversion from hours to years varies because of leap years and exposure schedules, but approximate conversions are:

1 mSv/h = 8.766 Sv/a
114.1 μSv/h = 1 Sv/a

Conversion from hourly rates to annual rates is further complicated by seasonal fluctuations in natural radiation, decay of artificial sources, and intermittent proximity between humans and sources. The ICRP once adopted fixed conversion for occupational exposure, although these have not appeared in recent documents:

8 h = 1 day
40 h = 1 week
50 weeks = 1 year

Therefore, for occupation exposures of that time period,

1 mSv/h = 2 Sv/a
500 μSv/h = 1 Sv/a

== Ionizing radiation quantities ==
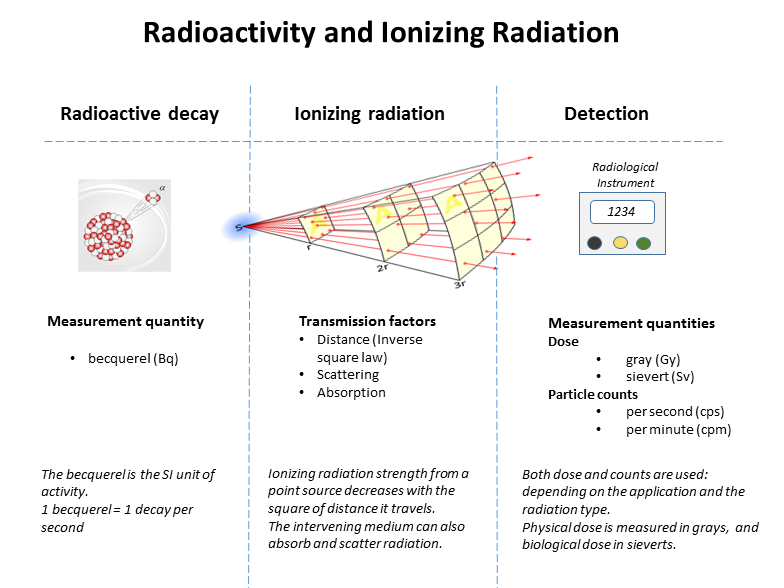
Graphic showing relationships between radioactivity and detected ionizing radiation

The following table shows radiation quantities in SI and non-SI units:

Ionizing radiation related quantities
Quantity	Unit	Symbol	Derivation	Year	SI equivalent
Activity (A)	becquerel	Bq	s^{−1}	1974	SI unit
Activity (A)	curie	Ci	3.7×10^{10} s^{−1}	1953	3.7×10^{10} Bq
Activity (A)	rutherford	Rd	10^{6} s^{−1}	1946	1000000 Bq
Exposure (X)	coulomb per kilogram	C/kg	C⋅kg^{−1} of air	1974	SI unit
Exposure (X)	röntgen	R	esu / 0.001293 g of air	1928	2.58×10^{−4} C/kg
Absorbed dose (D)	gray	Gy	J⋅kg^{−1}	1974	SI unit
Absorbed dose (D)	erg per gram	erg/g	erg⋅g^{−1}	1950	1.0×10^{−4} Gy
Absorbed dose (D)	rad	rad	100 erg⋅g^{−1}	1953	0.010 Gy
Equivalent dose (H)	sievert	Sv	J⋅kg^{−1} × W_{R}	1977	SI unit
Equivalent dose (H)	röntgen equivalent man	rem	100 erg⋅g^{−1} × W_{R}	1971	0.010 Sv
Effective dose (E)	sievert	Sv	J⋅kg^{−1} × W_{R} × W_{T}	1977	SI unit
Effective dose (E)	röntgen equivalent man	rem	100 erg⋅g^{−1} × W_{R} × W_{T}	1971	0.010 Sv

Although the United States Nuclear Regulatory Commission permits the use of the units curie, rad, and rem alongside SI units, the European Union European units of measurement directives required that their use for "public health ... purposes" be phased out by 31 December 1985.

=== Rem equivalence ===
An older unit for the dose equivalent is the rem, still often used in the United States. One sievert is equal to 100 rem:

100.0000 rem	=	100,000.0 mrem	=	1 Sv	=	1.000000 Sv	=	1000.000 mSv	=	1,000,000 μSv
1.0000 rem	=	1000.0 mrem	=	1 rem	=	0.010000 Sv	=	10.000 mSv	=	10000 μSv
0.1000 rem	=	100.0 mrem	=	1 mSv	=	0.001000 Sv	=	1.000 mSv	=	1000 μSv
0.0010 rem	=	1.0 mrem	=	1 mrem	=	0.000010 Sv	=	0.010 mSv	=	10 μSv
0.0001 rem	=	0.1 mrem	=	1 μSv	=	0.000001 Sv	=	0.001 mSv	=	1 μSv

== See also ==
- Acute radiation syndrome
- Becquerel (disintegrations per second)
- Counts per minute
- Radiation exposure
- Rutherford (unit)
- Gray (unit)
- Sverdrup (a non-SI unit of volume transport with the same symbol Sv as sievert)
