= Kerma (physics) =

Kinetic energy released by ionizing radiation from uncharged particles per unit mass

In radiation physics, kerma is an acronym for "kinetic energy released per unit mass" (alternately, "kinetic energy released in matter", "kinetic energy released in material", or "kinetic energy released in materials"), defined as the sum of the initial kinetic energies of all the charged particles liberated by uncharged ionizing radiation (i.e., indirectly ionizing radiation such as photons and neutrons) in a sample of matter, divided by the mass of the sample. It is defined by the quotient $K = \operatorname{d}\!E_\text{tr}/\operatorname{d}\!m$.

== Units ==
The SI unit of kerma is the gray (Gy) (or joule per kilogram), the same as the unit of absorbed dose. However, kerma can be different from absorbed dose, depending on the energies involved. This is because ionization energy is not accounted for. While kerma approximately equals absorbed dose at low energies, kerma is much higher than absorbed dose at higher energies, because some energy escapes from the absorbing volume in the form of bremsstrahlung (X-rays) or fast-moving electrons, and is not counted as absorbed dose.

== Process of energy transfer ==
Photon energy is transferred to matter in a two-step process. First, energy is transferred to charged particles in the medium through various photon interactions (e.g. photoelectric effect, Compton scattering, pair production, and photodisintegration). Next, these secondary charged particles transfer their energy to the medium through atomic excitation and ionizations.

For low-energy photons, kerma is numerically approximately the same as absorbed dose. For higher-energy photons, kerma is larger than absorbed dose because some highly energetic secondary electrons and X-rays escape the region of interest before depositing their energy. The escaping energy is counted in kerma, but not in absorbed dose. For low-energy X-rays, this is usually a negligible distinction. This can be understood when one looks at the components of kerma.

There are two independent contributions to the total kerma, collision kerma $k_\text{col}$ and radiative kerma $k_\text{rad}$ – thus, $K = k_\text{col} + k_\text{rad}$. Collision kerma results in the production of electrons that dissipate their energy as ionization and excitation due to the interaction between the charged particle and the atomic electrons. Radiative kerma results in the production of radiative photons due to the interaction between the charged particle and atomic nuclei (mostly via Bremsstrahlung radiation), but can also include photons produced by annihilation of positrons in flight.

Frequently, the quantity $k_\text{col}$ is of interest, and is usually expressed as

$$k_\text{col} = K (1 - g),$$

where g is the average fraction of energy transferred to electrons that is lost through bremsstrahlung.

== Calibration of radiation protection instruments ==
Air kerma is of importance in the practical calibration of instruments for photon measurement, where it is used for the traceable calibration of gamma instrument metrology facilities using a "free air" ion chamber to measure air kerma.

IAEA safety report 16 states "The quantity air kerma should be used for calibrating the reference photon radiation fields and reference instruments. Radiation protection monitoring instruments should be calibrated in terms of dose equivalent quantities. Area dosimeters or dose ratemeters should be calibrated in terms of the ambient dose equivalent, H*(10), or the directional dose equivalent, H′(0.07), without any phantom present, i.e. free in air."

Conversion coefficients from air kerma in Gy to equivalent dose in Sv are published in the International Commission on Radiological Protection (ICRP) report 74 (1996). For instance, air kerma rate is converted to tissue equivalent dose using a factor of Sv/Gy (air) = 1.21 for ^{137}Cs radioactive source emitting photons at 0.662 MeV.

== See also ==
- Exposure (radiation)
- Sievert
- Dosimetry in Diagnostic Radiology An International Code of Practice - IAEA. - describes techniques for the measurement of air kerma in free air.
