= Becquerel =

SI derived unit of radioactivity

becquerel
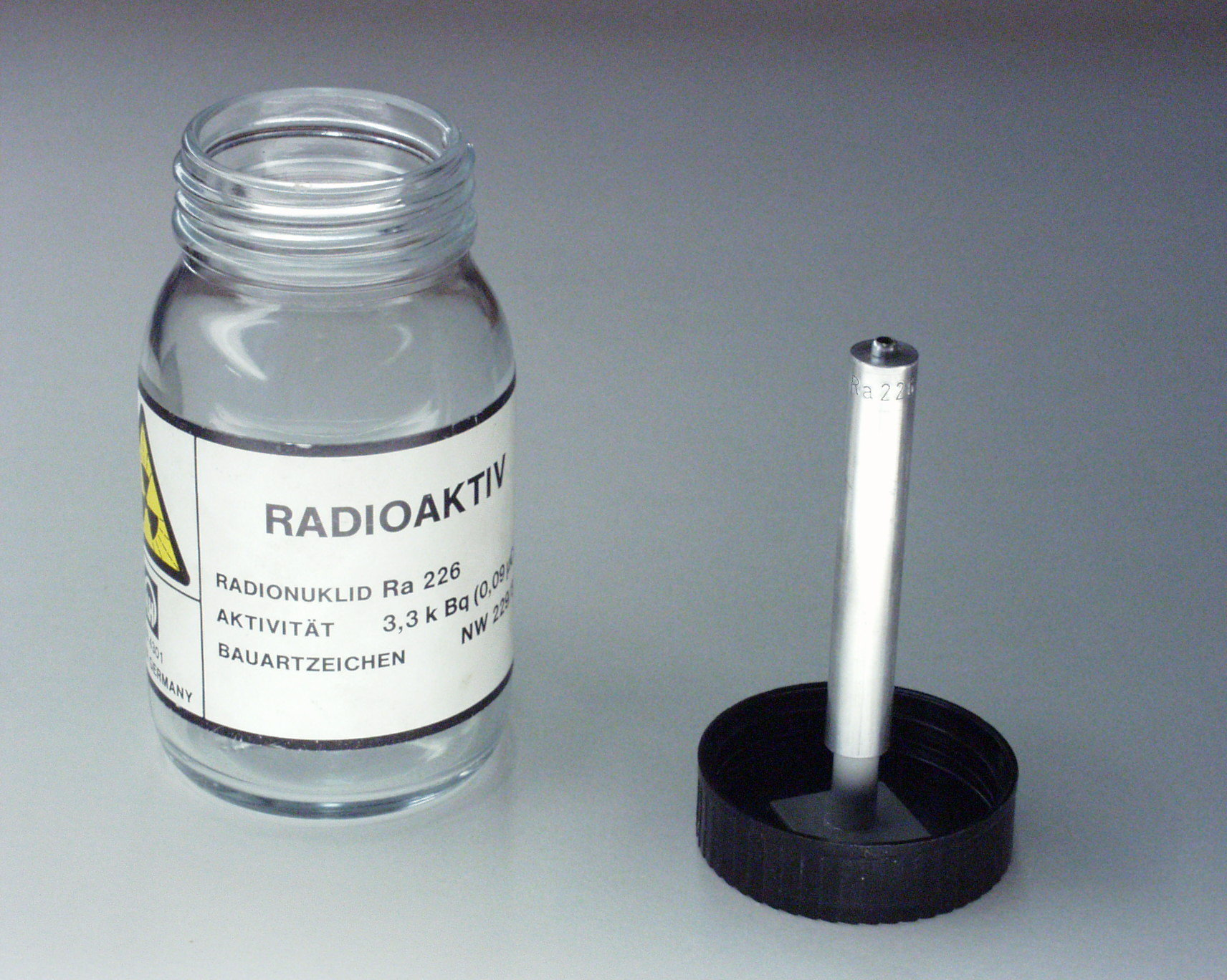
- Radium-226 radiation source. Activity 3300 Bq (3.3 kBq)

General information
- Unit system: SI
- Unit of: activity
- Symbol: Bq
- Named after: Henri Becquerel

Conversions
| 1 Bq in ... | ... is equal to ... |
- rutherford: 10^{−6} Rd
- curie: 2.703×10^{−11} Ci ≅ 27 pCi
- SI base unit: s^{−1}

The becquerel (/ˌbɛkəˈrɛl/; symbol: Bq) is the unit of radioactivity in the International System of Units (SI). One becquerel is defined as an activity of one per second, on average, for aperiodic activity events referred to a radionuclide. For applications relating to human health this is a small quantity, and SI multiples of the unit are commonly used.

The becquerel is named after Henri Becquerel, who shared a Nobel Prize in Physics with Pierre and Marie Curie in 1903 for their work in discovering radioactivity.

== Definition ==
1 Bq = 1 s^{−1}

A special name was introduced for the reciprocal second (s^{−1}) to represent radioactivity to avoid potentially dangerous mistakes with prefixes. For example, 1 μs^{−1} would mean 10^{6} disintegrations per second: (10^{−6} s)^{−1} = 10^{6} s^{−1}, whereas 1 μBq would mean 1 disintegration per 1 million seconds: 10^{–6} s^{–1}. Other names considered were hertz (Hz), a special name already in use for the reciprocal second (for periodic events of any kind), and fourier (Fr; after Joseph Fourier). The hertz is now only used for periodic phenomena. While 1 Hz replaces the deprecated term cycle per second, 1 Bq refers to one event per second on average for aperiodic radioactive decays.

The gray (Gy) and the becquerel (Bq) were introduced in 1975. Between 1953 and 1975, absorbed dose was often measured with the rad. Decay activity was given with the curie before 1946 and often with the rutherford between 1946 and 1975.

== Unit capitalization and prefixes ==
As with every International System of Units (SI) unit named after a person, the first letter of its symbol is uppercase (Bq). However, when an SI unit is spelled out in English, it should always begin with a lowercase letter (becquerel)—except in a situation where any word in that position would be capitalized, such as at the beginning of a sentence or in material using title case.

Like any SI unit, Bq can be prefixed; commonly used multiples are kBq (kilobecquerel, 10^{3} Bq), MBq (megabecquerel, 10^{6} Bq, equivalent to 1 rutherford), GBq (gigabecquerel, 10^{9} Bq), TBq (terabecquerel, 10^{12} Bq), and PBq (petabecquerel, 10^{15} Bq). Large prefixes are common for practical uses of the unit.

== Examples ==
For practical applications, 1 Bq is a small unit. For example, there is roughly 0.017 g of potassium-40 in a typical human body, producing about 4,400 decays per second (Bq).

The activity of radioactive americium in a home smoke detector is about 37 kBq (1 μCi).

Carbon-14 is produced in the atmosphere by cosmic ray neutrons striking nitrogen atoms at a rate around 1 PBq per year. The global inventory of carbon-14 is estimated to be 8.5×10^{18} Bq (8.5 EBq, 8.5 exabecquerel).

These examples are useful for comparing the amount of activity of these radioactive materials, but should not be confused with the amount of exposure to ionizing radiation that these materials represent. The level of exposure and thus the absorbed dose received are what should be considered when assessing the effects of ionizing radiation on humans.

== Relation to the curie ==
Relation between some ionizing radiation units

The becquerel succeeded the curie (Ci), an older, non-SI unit of radioactivity based on the activity of 1 gram of radium-226. The curie is defined as 3.7×10^{10} s^{−1}, or 37 GBq.

Conversion factors:

- 1 Ci = 3.7×10^{10} Bq = 37 GBq
- 1 μCi = 37000 Bq = 37 kBq
- 1 Bq = 2.7×10^{−11} Ci = 2.7×10^{−5} μCi
- 1 MBq = 0.027 mCi

== Relation to other radiation-related quantities ==
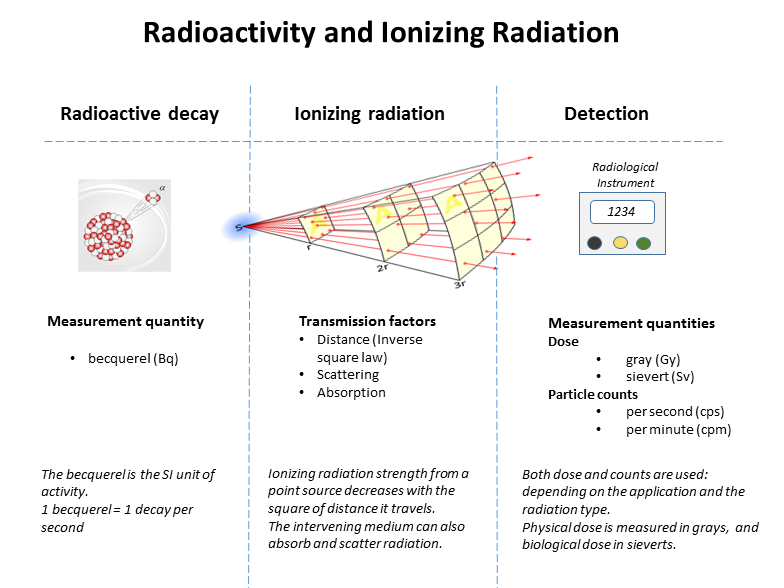
Graphic showing relationships between radioactivity and detected ionizing radiation

The following table shows radiation quantities in SI and non-SI units. W_{R} (formerly 'Q' factor) is a factor that scales the biological effect for different types of radiation, relative to x-rays (e.g. 1 for beta radiation, 20 for alpha radiation, and a complicated function of energy for neutrons). In general, conversion between rates of emission, the density of radiation, the fraction absorbed, and the biological effects, requires knowledge of the geometry between source and target, the energy and the type of the radiation emitted, among other factors.

Ionizing radiation related quantities
| Quantity | Unit | Symbol | Derivation | Year | SI equivalent |
|---|---|---|---|---|---|
| Activity (A) | becquerel | Bq | s^{−1} | 1974 | SI unit |
| Activity (A) | curie | Ci | 3.7×10^{10} s^{−1} | 1953 | 3.7×10^{10} Bq |
| Activity (A) | rutherford | Rd | 10^{6} s^{−1} | 1946 | 1000000 Bq |
| Exposure (X) | coulomb per kilogram | C/kg | C⋅kg^{−1} of air | 1974 | SI unit |
| Exposure (X) | röntgen | R | esu / 0.001293 g of air | 1928 | 2.58×10^{−4} C/kg |
| Absorbed dose (D) | gray | Gy | J⋅kg^{−1} | 1974 | SI unit |
| Absorbed dose (D) | erg per gram | erg/g | erg⋅g^{−1} | 1950 | 1.0×10^{−4} Gy |
| Absorbed dose (D) | rad | rad | 100 erg⋅g^{−1} | 1953 | 0.010 Gy |
| Equivalent dose (H) | sievert | Sv | J⋅kg^{−1} × W_{R} | 1977 | SI unit |
| Equivalent dose (H) | röntgen equivalent man | rem | 100 erg⋅g^{−1} × W_{R} | 1971 | 0.010 Sv |
| Effective dose (E) | sievert | Sv | J⋅kg^{−1} × W_{R} × W_{T} | 1977 | SI unit |
| Effective dose (E) | röntgen equivalent man | rem | 100 erg⋅g^{−1} × W_{R} × W_{T} | 1971 | 0.010 Sv |

== See also ==
- Background radiation
- Banana equivalent dose
- Counts per minute
- Orders of magnitude (radiation)
- Radiation poisoning
- Relative biological effectiveness
