= Erg =

Erg, Ergs or ERG may also refer to:

== Arts and entertainment ==
- Mikey Erg (born 1980), American musician
- Erg (character), a fictional character in the Marvel Comics Universe
- Erg (Hyperion), a creature in the Hyperion Cantos series by Dan Simmons

== Organisations ==
- Education Reference Group, in Connecticut, US
- Erg (company), an Italian energy company
- Efficiency and Reform Group (May 2010 – October 2014), former part of the Cabinet Office of the UK
- Eurasian Resources Group, a Luxembourgish mining and smelting company
- European Research Group, anti-EU group of British Conservative MPs
- Videlli, an Australian smart card ticketing system manufacturer formerly known as ERG Group

== Places ==
- English Riviera Geopark, in Torbay, England
- Erbogachen Airport (IATA code), Russia

== Science and technology ==
- erg (unit), unit of energy, equal to 10^{−7} joules
- Electron-releasing group
- Electroretinography, or electroretinogram
- Erg (landform), sand dune field
- ERG (gene)
- ERG theory, in psychology
- Exploration of Energization and Radiation in Geospace, now Arase, a Japanese scientific satellite

== Other uses ==
- Employee resource group, groups of employees who join together in their workplace
- Emergency Response Guidebook, a hazardous-materials (HAZMAT) reference book
- Erg (indoor rower)
- Erg (tug), a Canadian tug, sunk in Halifax Harbour in 1943
- Ergative case
