= List of Heroes of the Soviet Union (R) =

The Hero of the Soviet Union was the highest distinction of the Soviet Union. It was awarded 12,775 times. Due to the large size of the list, it has been broken up into multiple pages.

- Mikhail Rabovalyuk (ru)
- Aleksandr Rabstevich (ru)
- Ivan Radayev (ru)
- Nikolai Radayev (ru)
- Ivan Radaykin (ru)
- Narza Radzhabov (ru)
- Aleksei Radzievsky
- Semyon Radilovsky (ru)
- Nikolai Raduonov (ru)
- Aleksandr Radkevich (ru)
- Mikhail Radugin (ru)
- Feofan Radugin (ru)
- Fyodor Radus (ru)
- Vasily Dmitrievich Radchenko (ru)
- Vasily Ivanovich Radchenko (ru)
- Mikhail Radchenko (ru)
- Pavel Radchuk (ru)
- Grigory Raevsky (ru)
- Ivan Raevsky (ru)
- Konstantin Razhev (ru)
- Ivan Razvolyaev (ru)
- Aleksandr Razginin (ru)
- Gavriil Razenkov (ru)
- Vasily Razin (ru)
- Viktor Razin (ru)
- Ivan Razin (ru)
- Sergey Razin (ru)
- Filipp Razin (ru)
- Semyon Razinkin (ru)
- Galaktion Razmadze (ru)
- Aleksandr Razumov (ru)
- Aleksandr Rai (ru)
- Anatoly Raikov (ru)
- Aleksandr Raikunov (ru)
- Aleksandr Railyan (ru)
- Yan Rainberg (ru)
- Pavel Rak (ru)
- Aleksandr Rakov (ru)
- Vasily Ivanovich Rakov (twice)
- Vasily Sergeyevich Rakov (ru)
- Dmitry Rakus (ru)
- Konstantin Rakutin
- Dmitry Rakshin (ru)
- Mikhail Raldugin (ru)
- Pavel Ranzhev (ru)
- Maksim Rapeiko (ru)
- Marina Raskova
- Tsezar Raskovinsky (ru)
- Anatoly Rasnitsov (ru)
- Pyotr Raspopin (ru)
- Ivan Raspopov (ru)
- Pyotr Raspopov (ru)
- Nina Raspopova
- Pyotr Rassadkin (ru)
- Aleksandr Rasskazov (ru)
- Konstantin Rasskazov (ru)
- Semyon Rassokha (ru)
- Leonid Rassokhin (ru)
- Boris Rastoropov (ru)
- Pyotr Ratnikov (ru)
- Andrei Ratov (ru)
- Larisa Ratushnaya
- Najafgulu Rafiyev
- Anatoly Raftopullo (ru)
- Abdusattar Rakhimov (ru)
- Azin Rakhimov (ru)
- Baki Rakhimov (ru)
- Sobir Rakhimov
- Rakhimbai Rakhimov (ru)
- Shamil Rakhmatulin (ru)
- Viktor Rakhov (ru)
- Ivan Rachov (ru)
- Pavel Rachov (ru)
- Aleksandr Rashevsky (ru)
- Grigory Rashutin (ru)
- Aleksandr Rashchupkin (ru)
- Andrei Rashchupkin (ru)
- Pavel Revenok (ru)
- Kumza Rebrik (ru)
- Mikhail Rebrov (ru)
- Vasily Reva (ru)
- Ivan Reva (ru)
- Ivan Revkov (ru)
- Nikonor Revutsky (ru)
- Vasily Revyakin (ru)
- Pena Redzhepov (ru)
- Anatoly Redin (ru)
- Nikolai Redkin (ru)
- Nikolai Redkovsky (ru)
- Pyotr Redchenkov (ru)
- Dmitry Redkin (ru)
- Nikolai Redkin (ru)
- Aleksei Redko (ru)
- Filipp Redko (ru)
- Viktor Rezanov (ru)
- Leonid Rezvykh (ru)
- Kirill Rezenkov (ru)
- Fyodor Reznik (ru)
- Ivan Reznichenko (ru)
- Semyon Reznichenko (ru)
- Dmitry Rezuto (ru)
- Grigory Rezyapkin (ru)
- Vladimir Remek
- Fyodor Remennoi (ru)
- Vasily Remizov (ru)
- Ivan Remizov (ru)
- Mikhail Remizov (ru)
- Aleksei Renzayev (ru)
- Vasily Renov (ru)
- Mikhail Rents (ru)
- Aleksandr Repin (ru)
- Ivan Repin (ru)
- Stepan Repin
- Akim Repin (ru)
- Nikolai Repnikov (ru)
- Albert Repson (ru)
- Samoilo Reputin (ru)
- Mikhail Repchenko (ru)
- Aleksandr Retyunsky (ru)
- Grigory Rechkalov
- Ivan Reshetei (ru)
- Ivan Grigorievich Reshetnik (ru)
- Ivan Semyonovich Reshetnik (ru)
- Vasily Reshetnikov
- Nikolai Reshetnikov (ru)
- Aleksei Reshetov (ru)
- Pavel Reshetov (ru)
- Sergey Reshetov (ru)
- Abdraim Reshidov
- Ivan Reshilin (ru)
- Nikita Rzhavsky (ru)
- Pavel Rzhevsky (ru)
- Denis Rzyanin (ru)
- Boris Rivkin (ru)
- Nikolai Rigachin (ru)
- Stepan Ridny (ru)
- Bazar Rinchino (ru)
- Vasily Rovencky (ru)
- Fyodor Rovchakov (ru)
- Pyotr Rogalyov (ru)
- Mikhail Iosifovich Rogalyov (ru)
- Mikhail Kirillovich Rogalyov (ru)
- Georgy Rogachevsky (ru)
- Aleksei Rogov (ru)
- Leonid Rogov (ru)
- Mikhail Rogov (ru)
- Nikolai Rogov (ru)
- Aleksei Rogozhin (ru)
- Vasily Rogozhin (ru)
- Andrei Rogozhnikov (ru)
- Nikolai Rogozhnikov (ru)
- Fedosy Rogozhnikov (ru)
- Anatoly Rogozin (ru)
- Vladimir Rogozin (ru)
- Pyotr Rogozin (ru)
- Frants Rogulsky (ru)
- Konstantin Rodenko (ru)
- Aleksandr Rodimtsev (twice)
- Aleksei Rodin
- Dmitry Rodin
- Nikolai Rodin
- Sergey Rodinka (ru)
- Aleksei Rodionov (ru)
- Vasily Rodionov (ru)
- Vladimir Rodionov (ru)
- Ivan Rodionov (ru)
- Mikhail Aleksandrovich Rodionov (ru)
- Mikhail Yegorovich Rodionov (ru)
- Mikhail Iosifovich Rodionov (ru)
- Mikhail Fyodorovich Rodionov (ru)
- Pyotr Rodionov (ru)
- Sergey Rodionov (ru)
- Aleksandr Roditelev (ru)
- Mikhail Rodichev (ru)
- Mikhail Rodnykh (ru)
- Valentin Rodchenko (ru)
- Pyotr Rodygin (ru)
- Valery Rozhdestvensky
- Aleksandr Rozhkov (ru)
- Nikolai Rozhnev (ru)
- Nikolai Rozhnov (ru)
- Vasily Rozanov (ru)
- Ivan Rozanov (ru)
- Nikolai Rozenko (ru)
- Aleksandr Rozka (ru)
- Nikolai Rozov (ru)
- Aleksei Roi (ru)
- Aleksandr Roichenko (ru)
- Lavr Rokin (ru)
- Aleksei Tokityansky (ru)
- Konstantin Rokossovsky
- Nikolai Rolin (ru)
- Gayaz Romayev (ru)
- Aleksei Roman (ru)
- Sergey Roman (ru)
- Aleksandr Sergeyevich Romanenko (ru)
- Aleksandr Fomich Romanenko (ru)
- Aleksei Danilovich Romanenko (ru)
- Aleksei Fedoseyevich Romanenko (ru)
- Andrei Romanenko (ru)
- Vasily Romanenko (ru)
- Georgy Romanenko (ru)
- Ivan Georgievich Romanenko (ru)
- Ivan Ivanovich Romanenko (ru)
- Pyotr Romanenko (ru)
- Yuri Romanenko
- Aleksandr Romanenkov (ru)
- Nikolai Romanenkov (ru)
- Stepan Romanets (ru)
- Aleksandr Romankov (ru)
- Aleksandr Georgievich Romanov (ru)
- Aleksandr Dmitrievich Romanov (ru)
- Boris Romanov (ru)
- Vasily Mikhailovich Romanov (ru)
- Vasily Fyodorovich Romanov (ru)
- Vladimir Romanov (ru)
- Grigory Romanov (ru)
- Yevgeny Romanov (ru)
- Yegor Romanov (ru)
- Ivan Romanov (ru)
- Mikhail Romanov (ru)
- Nikolai Kirillovich Romanov (ru)
- Nikolai Fyodorovich Romanov (ru)
- Pavel Romanov (ru)
- Pyotr Ivanovich Romanov (ru)
- Pyotr Ilyich Romanov (ru)
- Semyon Romanov (ru)
- Sergey Romanov (ru)
- Yakov Romanov (ru)
- Sergei Romanovtsev
- Ivan Romanchenko (ru)
- Pavel Romanchuk (ru)
- Mikhail Romankov (ru)
- Vasily Romanyuk (ru)
- Grigory Romanyuk (ru)
- Nikolai Romanyuk (ru)
- Aleksandr Romanyutin (ru)
- Prokofy Romas (ru)
- Mikhail Romashin (ru)
- Ivan Romashkin (ru)
- Timofei Romashkin (ru)
- Nikolai Romashko (ru)
- Pavel Romenko (ru)
- Vasily Romin (ru)
- Aleksandr Rorat (ru)
- Pavel Raslik (ru)
- Ivan Rosly (ru)
- Aleksei Roslyakov (ru)
- Anatoly Roslyakov (ru)
- Boris Rossokhin (ru)
- Shota Rostiashvili (ru)
- Apoven Rostomyan (ru)
- Andrei Rotenko (ru)
- Fyodor Rotko (ru)
- Pavel Rotmistrov
- Anatoly Roshchaninov (ru)
- Vladimir Roshchenko (ru)
- Vasily Roshchepkin (ru)
- Aleksandr Roshchin (ru)
- Ivan Roshchin (ru)
- Lev Roshchin (ru)
- Nikolai Roshchin (ru)
- Stepan Roshchupkin (ru)
- Andrei Ruban (ru)
- Nikolai Ruban (ru)
- Pyotr Ruban (ru)
- Pyotr Rubanov (ru)
- Anatoly Rubakhin (ru)
- Filipp Rubakho (ru)
- Vladimir Rubinsky (ru)
- Vladimir Rublevsky (ru)
- Ivan Rublenko (ru)
- Sergey Rubusin (ru)
- Anatoly Rubtsov (ru)
- Gerasim Rubtsov (ru)
- Nikanor Rubtsov (ru)
- Nikolai Rubtsov (ru)
- Vladimir Rubchenkov (ru)
- Veniamin Ruvinsky (ru)
- Aleksandr Rudakov (ru)
- Yevgeny Rudakov (ru)
- Nikolai Rudakov (ru)
- Pavel Rudakov (ru)
- Sergey Rudakov (ru)
- Aleksandr Yeliseyevich Rudenko (ru)
- Aleksandr Konstantinovich Rudenko (ru)
- Andrei Rudenko (ru)
- Ivan Rudenko (ru)
- Mikhail Rudenko (ru)
- Nikolai Ivanovich Rudenko (ru)
- Nikolai Matveyevich Rudenko (ru)
- Nikolai Sergeyevich Rudenko (ru)
- Pyotr Rudenko (ru)
- Sergey Rudenko
- Yakov Rudenok (ru)
- Filipp Rudkin
- Aleksei Rudnev (ru)
- Vasily Rudnev (ru)
- Semyon Rudnev
- Sergei Rudnev (ru)
- Yevgeniya Rudneva
- Ivan Rudnichenko (ru)
- Arkady Rudnov (ru)
- Anatoly Rudoy (ru)
- Nikolai Rudomyotov (ru)
- Fyodor Rudskoy (ru)
- Nikolai Rudyk (ru)
- Nikolai Rud (ru)
- Vladimir Ruzhin (ru)
- Aleksei Ruznyaev (ru)
- Ibarruri Ruis Ruben (ru)
- Vladimir Rukavitsyn (ru)
- Nikolai Rukavishnikov
- Ignat Rukin (ru)
- Aleksandr Rulyov (ru)
- Ivan Rulyov (ru)
- Aleksandr Andreyevich Rumyantsev (ru)
- Aleksandr Yevdokimovich Rumyantsev (ru)
- Aleksandr Stepanovich Rumuantsev (ru)
- Aleksei Rumyantsev (ru)
- Dmitry Rumyantsev (ru)
- Ivan Vasilyevich Rumyantsev (ru)
- Ivan Nikolayevich Rumyantsev (ru)
- Mikhail Rumyantsev (ru)
- Nikita Rumyantsev (ru)
- Fyodor Rumyantsev (ru)
- Boris Runov (ru)
- Vasily Rusakov (ru)
- Kliment Rusakov (ru)
- Ivan Rusakov (ru)
- Mikhail Rusakov (ru)
- Ivan Rusin (ru)
- Nikita Rusin (ru)
- Vasily Rusinov (ru)
- Veniamin Rusov (ru)
- Ivan Russiyanov
- Afanasy Russkikh (ru)
- Pyotr Russkikh (ru)
- Kharlampy Russkikh (ru)
- Vardkes Rustamyan (ru)
- Tashtemir Rustemov (ru)
- Aleksei Rutchin (ru)
- Aleksandr Rukhlyadev (ru)
- Aleksandr Rutskoi
- Aleksandr Ruchin (ru)
- Mikhail Rybak (ru)
- Ulyan Rybak (ru)
- Aleksandr Rybakov (ru)
- Aleksei Rybakov (ru)
- Anatoly Rybakov (ru)
- Nikolai Rybakov (ru)
- Aleksei Rybalka (ru)
- Vasily Rybalko (ru)
- Ivan Ignatevich Rybalko (ru)
- Ivan Fyodorovich Rybalko (ru)
- Pavel Rybalko
- Semyon Rybalchenko (ru)
- Leonid Rybachkovsky (ru)
- Aleksandr Rybin (ru)
- Ivan Rybin (ru)
- Nikolai Rybin (ru)
- Aleksandr Rybkin (ru)
- Andrei Rybkin (ru)
- Vasily Rybkin (ru)
- Nikolai Rybko
- Aleksandr Rybnikov (ru)
- Vsevolod Ryvzh (ru)
- Vasily Ryzhenkov (ru)
- Nikolai Ryzhenkov (ru)
- Leonid Ryzhy (ru)
- Anatoly Ryzhikov (ru)
- Anton Ryzhkov (ru)
- Valery Ryzhkov (ru)
- Ivan Ryzhkov (ru)
- Aleksandr Dmitrievich Ryzhov (ru)
- Aleksandr Ivanovich Ryzhov
- Aleksandr Petrovich Ryzhov (ru)
- Andrei Ryzhov (ru)
- Vasily Ryzhov (ru)
- Vladimir Ryzhov (ru)
- Georgy Ryzhov (ru)
- Yevgraf Ryzhov (ru)
- Ivan Ryzhov (ru)
- Mikhailovich Grigorievich Ryzhov (ru)
- Mikhail Ivanovich Ryzhov (ru)
- Yuri Rykachyov (ru)
- Konstantin Rykov (ru)
- Leonid Rykov (ru)
- Valery Rylov (ru)
- Pavel Ryndin (ru)
- Vasily Ryndya (ru)
- Flavian Rysevets (ru)
- Ilya Rysyuk (ru)
- Leonid Rytikov (ru)
- Aleksandr Rytov (ru)
- Nikolai Rytov (ru)
- Aleksandr Rykhlov (ru)
- Pavel Rychagov
- Ivan Ryshkov (ru)
- Mikhail Ryukin (ru)
- Valery Ryumin
- Nikolai Ryabinin (ru)
- Aleksandr Ryabov (ru)
- Andrei Ryabov (ru)
- Vasily Ryabov (ru)
- Konstantin Ryabov (ru)
- Mikhail Ryabov (ru)
- Sergey Ryabov (ru)
- Yekaterina Ryabova
- Vladimir Ryabok (ru)
- Mikhail Ryaboshapka (ru)
- Vasily Ryaboshapko (ru)
- Grigory Ryabushko (ru)
- Boris Ryabtsev (ru)
- Mikhail Ryabtsev (ru)
- Aleksandr Ryabtsov (ru)
- Mikhail Ryabchevsky (ru)
- Fyodor Ryabykin (ru)
- Nikolai Rubykh
- Pyotr Ryabykh (ru)
- Aleksey Ryazanov (twice)
- Vasily Ryazanov (twice)
- Ivan Ryazanov (ru)
- Aleksandr Ryazantsev (ru)
- Aleksei Pavlovich Ryazantsev (ru)
- Aleksei Fyodorovich Ryazantsev (ru)
- Nikolai Ryazantsev (ru)
- Timofei Ryazantsev (ru)
- Nikolai Ryaposov (ru)
