= Valentin Khokhryakov =

Russian scientist (1928–2023)

Valentin Fedorovich Khokhryakov
- Born: 22 June 1928; Samara, Middle Volga Oblast, Russian SFSR, USSR
- Died: 20 November 2023 (aged 95); Ozyorsk, Chelyabinsk Oblast, Russia
- Education: Leningrad State University
- Awards: See list: USSR State Prize (1983); Medal "For Labour Valour"; Medal of the Order "For Merit to the Fatherland" (1997); Medal "Veteran of Labour"
- Scientific career
- Fields: internal dosimetry; radiobiology
- Workplaces: Moscow Engineering Physics Institute (Ozyorsk Branch) (1953-1957); Southern Urals Biophysics Institute
- Theses: Modelling biokinetic plutonium processes in human body (1986)
- Doctoral students: Sergey Anatolyevich Romanov

Valentin Fedorovich Khokhryakov (Russian: Валентин Федорович Хохряков; 22 June 1928 – 20 November 2023) was a Soviet and Russian scientist, internal dosimetry specialist, PhD in biology (1966), doctor of biology (1986), Professor (2006), awarded the USSR State Prize (1983), he was adjunct professor of the University of Utah (USA). He worked since 1957 at the Southern Urals Biophysics Institute. Khokhryakov was the author and coauthor of more than 170 research papers.

== Career and research ==
In 1950, he graduated from Physics faculty of Leningrad State University. He was sent to Mayak PA where he worked as an engineer and senior engineer (1951-1953). At age 25 (1953) he became a faculty member in the "Evening Department #1" of Moscow Engineering Physics Institute (Ozersk Branch of Moscow Engineering Physics Institute), was one of the founders of the Department of General Physics, at the same time lecturing on dosimetry, general and theoretical physics.

Following invitation of G.D. Baisogolov he had started dosimetry and radiobiology scientific study as the Chairman of the Medical Sanitary Unit #71 Biophysics Laboratory (1957).

Valentin Khokhryakov obtained his PhD degree in March 1966.

In 1967, he was elected and became the Head of the first Internal Dosimetry Laboratory in USSR that was in Branch 1 of the Biophysics Institute. Valentin Khokhryakov had created the laboratory in a short time, participated in the development and creation of a hardware and methodological complex for measuring fission fragments and actinides in the human body in the Experimental Department and in Clinic of professional radiation pathology. During his work, he developed the basic principles and outlined ways to solve many problems of internal dosimetry. He created and developed a dosimetric control system for personnel of the entire nuclear industry. He developed a computational model based on an original system for estimating the solubility of aerosols of transuranic nuclides.

In his doctoral thesis, he explored modelling biokinetic plutonium processes in human body (1986).

For many years he was a member of the editorial board of "Emergency medicine" (Russian: "Медицина катастроф"), till the end of his days he was a member of the editorial board of "Radiation Safety Issues" (Russian: "Вопросы радиационной безопасности").

5 PhD theses were generated under the guidance of Valentin Fedorovich.

== Personal life and death ==
Khokhryakov lived in Ozyorsk, Chelyabinsk oblast, Russia. He died there on 20 November 2023, at the age of 95.

== Awards and honours ==
Valentin Khokhryakov was awarded many honors, including a USSR State Prize (1983), medals "For Labour Valour", "Veteran of Labour", II Degree Medal of the Order "For Merit to the Fatherland" (1997), the badge "Excellent worker in healthcare", the badge "Veteran of nuclear energy and industry" (1997).

== Publications ==
His h-index in the International bibliographic and reference database Scopus reaches 23. Some of the most cited publications:

=== 1990s ===
- Suslova KG, Filipy RE, Khokhryakov VF, Romanov SA, Kathren RL (1996). "Comparison of the Dosimetry Registry of the Mayak Industrial Association and the United States Transuranium and Uranium Registries: A preliminary report". Radiation Protection Dosimetry. 67 (1): 13–22. doi:10.1093/oxfordjournals.rpd.a031791. ISSN 0144-8420.
- Khokhryakov VF, Menshikh ZS, Suslova KG, Kudryavtseva TI, Tokarskaya ZB, Romanov SA (1994). "Plutonium excretion model for the healthy man". Radiation Protection Dosimetry. 53 (1–4): 235–239. doi:10.1093/rpd/53.1-4.235. ISSN 0144-8420.

=== 2000s ===
- Vasilenko EK, Khokhryakov VF, Miller SC, Fix JJ, Eckerman K, Choe DO, Gorelov M, Khokhryakov VV, Knyasev V, Krahenbuhl MP, Scherpelz RI, Smetanin M (2007). "Mayak worker dosimetry study: An overview". Health Physics. 93 (3): 190–206. Bibcode:2007HeaPh..93..190V. doi:10.1097/01.HP.0000266071.43137.0e. ISSN 0017-9078. PMID 17693770. S2CID 23690159.
- Suslova KG, Khokhryakov VF, Tokarskaya ZB, Nifatov AP, Sokolova AB, Miller SC, Krahenbuhl MP (2006). "Modifying effects of health status, physiological, and dosimetric factors on extrapulmonary organ distribution and excretion of inhaled plutonium in workers at the Mayak Production Association". Health Physics. 90 (4): 299–311. Bibcode:2006HeaPh..90..299S. doi:10.1097/01.HP.0000183759.39785.9c. ISSN 0017-9078. PMID 16538136. S2CID 25119194.
- Hande MP, Azizova TV, Burak LE, Khokhryakov VF, Geard CR, Brenner DJ (2005). "Complex chromosome aberrations persist in individuals many years after occupational exposure to densely ionizing radiation: An mFISH study". Genes, Chromosomes and Cancer. 44 (1): 1–9. doi:10.1002/gcc.20217. ISSN 1045-2257. PMID 15912529. S2CID 31370377.
- Leggett RW, Eckerman KF, Khokhryakov VF, Suslova KG, Krahenbuhl MP, Miller SC (2005). "Mayak worker study: An improved biokinetic model for reconstructing doses from internally deposited plutonium". Health Physics. 164 (2): 111–122. Bibcode:2005RadR..164..111L. doi:10.1667/RR3371. ISSN 0033-7587. PMID 16038582. S2CID 2077600.
- Gilbert ES, Koshurnikova NA, Sokolnikov ME, Shilnikova NS, Preston DL, Ron E, Okatenko PV, Khokhryakov VF, Vasilenko EK, Miller S, Eckerman K, Romanov SA (2004). "Lung cancer in Mayak workers". Radiation Research. 162 (5): 505–516. Bibcode:2004RadR..162..505G. doi:10.1667/RR3259. ISSN 0033-7587. PMID 15624305. S2CID 19348556.
- Mitchell CR, Azizova TV, Hande MP, Burak LE, Tsakok JM, Khokhryakov VF, Geard CR, Brenner DJ (2004). "Stable intrachromosomal biomarkers of past exposure to densely ionizing radiation in several chromosomes of exposed individuals". Radiation Research. 162 (3): 257–263. Bibcode:2004RadR..162..257M. doi:10.1667/RR3231. ISSN 0033-7587. PMID 15378838. S2CID 689632.
- Hande MP, Azizova TV, Geard CR, Burak LE, Mitchell CR, Khokhryakov VF, Vasilenko EK, Brenner DJ (2003). "Past exposure to densely ionizing radiation leaves a unique permanent signature in the genome". American Journal of Human Genetics. 72 (5): 1162–1170. doi:10.1086/375041. ISSN 0002-9297. PMC 1180269. PMID 12679897.
- Khokhryakov V, Suslova K, Aladova E, Vasilenko E, Miller SC, Slaughter DM, Krahenbuhl MP (2000). "Development of an improved dosimetry system for the workers at the Mayak Production Association". Health Physics. 79 (1): 72–76. Bibcode:2000HeaPh..79...72K. doi:10.1097/00004032-200007000-00012. ISSN 0017-9078. PMID 10855780.
- Kreisheimer M, Koshurnikova NA, Nekolla E, Khokhryakov VF, Romanov SA, Sokolnikov ME, Shilnikova NS, Okatenko PV, Kellerer AM (2000). "Lung cancer mortality among male nuclear workers of the Mayak facilities in the former Soviet Union". Radiation Research. 154 (1): 3–11. doi:10.1667/0033-7587(2000)154[0003:LCMAMN]2.0.CO;2. ISSN 0033-7587. PMID 10856959. S2CID 78885348.
- Gilbert ES, Koshurnikova NA, Sokolnikov M, Khokhryakov VF, Miller S, Preston DL, Romanov SA, Shilnikova NS, Suslova KG, Vostrotin VV (2000). "Liver cancers in Mayak workers". Radiation Research. 154 (3): 246–252. doi:10.1667/0033-7587(2000)154[0246:LCIMW]2.0.CO;2. ISSN 0033-7587. PMID 10956429. S2CID 33388827.
- Koshurnikova NA, Gilbert ES, Sokolnikov M, Khokhryakov VF, Miller S, Preston DL, Romanov SA, Shilnikova NS, Suslova KG, Vostrotin VV (2000). "Bone cancers in Mayak workers". Radiation Research. 154 (3): 237–245. doi:10.1667/0033-7587(2000)154[0237:BCIMW]2.0.CO;2. ISSN 0033-7587. PMID 10956428. S2CID 11724678.

=== 2010s ===
- Khokhryakov VV, Khokhryakov VF, Suslova KG, Vostrotin VV, Vvedensky VE, Sokolova AB, Krahenbuhl MP, Birchall A, Miller SC, Schadilov AE, Ephimov AV (2013). "Mayak worker dosimetry system 2008 (MWDS-2008): Assessment of internal dose from measurement results of plutonium activity in urine". Health Physics. 104 (4): 366–378. doi:10.1097/HP.0b013e31827dbf60. ISSN 1538-5159. PMID 23439140. S2CID 20108200.
