= Pavel Povinec =

Slovak nuclear scientist (born 1942)

- Born: February 18, 1942 (age 84); Ochodnica, Slovakia
- Education: Comenius University in Bratislava
- Spouse: Elena
- Children: Pavol, Peter
- Scientific career
- Fields: Nuclear physics, Environmental physics
- Workplaces: Comenius University in Bratislava, IAEA - MEL, Monaco

Pavel P. Povinec (born 1942) is Professor of Physics at Faculty of Mathematics, Physics and Informatics of the Comenius University in Bratislava (Slovakia). Head of the Centre for Nuclear and Accelerator Technologies (CENTA)

== Education and career ==
He was educated at the Faculty of Natural Sciences of the Comenius University in Bratislava, where in 1965 he obtained a master degree in physics (specialization Nuclear physics), a PhD in 1974 for development of gas proportional counters, and in 1984 he became full Professor of Physics. In 1980 he became Vice-Dean at the newly established Faculty of Mathematics and Physics of the Comenius University, where in 1981 he became Head of the Department of Nuclear Physics. In 1993 he moved to International Atomic Energy Agency’s (IAEA) Marine Environment Laboratories in Monaco, where he became Head of Radiometrics Laboratory

In 2005, after retiring from IAEA, he returned to his home, Comenius University, to continue his research on investigations of rare nuclear processes and environmental radioactivity. After successful applications for EU Structural funds, he established in 2013 the CENTA with a tandem accelerator of ions and ion beam analysis (IBA) lines, which was fully equipped in 2022 with accelerator mass spectrometry (AMS) line.

P. Povinec is distinguished for his contributions to the development of ultrasensitive techniques for radioactivity research (gas proportional counters, low-level gamma spectrometry, mass spectrometry), with applications in nuclear physics (rare nuclear processes and decays), in astrophysics (search for dark matter particles, radioactivity of meteorites), environmental physics (radioactivity of the atmosphere, impacts of nuclear power plants on the environment (including Chernobyl and Fukushima accidents), climate change studies), isotope oceanography (isotope tracing of processes in the marine environment, assessment of impacts of radioactive dumping sites and nuclear bomb test sites on the marine environment), and radiocarbon dating (archeological objects, food products, etc.). He was leading more than 20 international projects (IAEA, EC, STA Japan, FAO, UNESCO), and he has also been responsible for Slovak participation in international experiments (SuperNEMO, LEGEND, and CRESST). According to SCOPUS he published about 400 papers with more than 10,000 citations (Hirsch index h = 50).

He was a member of the EU, IAEA, Japan, and South Korea panels on the assessment of the Fukushima accident. He has also been active in the organization of international conferences, and recently he established a new series of conferences on environmental radioactivity (ENVIRA). He participated in an organization of about 50 international conferences, and delivered about 40 invited lectures. He has been a member of editorial boards of several scientific journals (Scientific Reports/Nature, Radiocarbon, Journal of Environmental Radioactivity, Journal of Radioanalytical and Nuclear Chemistry, etc.). As an editor and co-editor he prepared more than 20 special issues of international journals.

== Selected awards and honors ==
- 2022: Slovak Academy of Sciences Dionyz Ilkovič Award
- 2022: Honorary Member of the Slovak Physical Society
- 2021: Elected Member of the Learned Society of Slovakia
- 2018: State Award of Slovakia - “Pribina Cross 1st Class”
- 2018: Elected Member of the European Academy of Sciences and Arts
- 2017: Hevesy Medal Award
- 2017: Scientist of the Year of Slovakia
- 2014: PROSE Award of American Science Publishers for the best book in Environmental Sciences (PP Povinec, K Hirose, M Aoyama: Fukushima Accident: Radioactivity Impact on the Environment, Elsevier, New York, 2013)
- 2005: Nobel Peace Prize (Member of the IAEA team), Oslo
- 2004: IAEA Award, International Atomic Energy Agency, Vienna

== Selected recent books and book chapters ==
- Povinec PP, Hirose K, Aoyama M, Tateda T. 2021. Fukushima Accident: 10 Years After (560p, Elsevier, New York).
- Povinec, PP, Hirose K, Aoyama M. 2013. Fukushima Accident: Radioactivity Impact on the Environment (382p, Elsevier, New York).
- Povinec PP, Eriksson M, Scholten J, Betti M. 2020. Marine Radioactivity Analysis. In: Handbook of Radioactivity Analysis, Ed. M.F. L’Annunziata, Academic Press, New York, Vol. 2, p. 316- 392.
- Povinec PP, Hirose K. 2020. Radionuclides as Tracers of Ocean Currents. In: Encyclopedia of Sustainability Science and Technology, Ed. R.A. Meyers, Springer Nature, New York, p. 1-37, 2020.
- Hong GH, Povinec PP. 2021. The Oceans – Formation and Global Climate Change. Encyclopedia on Nuclear Energy, Elsevier, New York, p. 485–504.
- Hong GH, Povinec PP. 2021. The Oceans - Implications of Manmade Radiation. Encyclopedia on Nuclear Energy, Elsevier, New York, p. 505-519.

== Selected 10 papers in journals (covering different fields) ==
- Povinec PP. 2018. New ultra-sensitive radioanalytical technologies for new science (Hevesy lecture). J. Radioanal. Nucl. Chem. 316, 893–931.
- Povinec PP et al. 2015. A new IBA-AMS laboratory at the Comenius University in Bratislava (Slovakia). Nucl. Instr. Meth. Phys. Res. B 342, 321–326.
- Arnold R,... Povinec PP et al. NEMO-3 Collaboration. 2019. Detailed studies of 100Mo two-neutrino double beta decay in NEMO-3. Eur. Phys. J. C (2019) 79:440
- Abgrall N,... Povinec PP et al. LEGEND Collaboration. 2017. The large enriched germanium experiment for neutrinoless double beta decay (LEGEND). AIP Conf. Proc. 1894, 020027.
- Mancuso M,... Povinec, P.P. et al. CRESST Collaboration. (2020). Searches for light dark matter with the CRESST-III experiment. J. Low Temp. Phys. 199, 510–518
- King AJ,... Povinec PP et al. 2022. The Winchcombe meteorite, a unique and pristine witness from the outer solar system. Science Advances 8 (46), eabq3925.
- Povinec PP et al. 2015. Radiocarbon in the atmosphere of the Žlkovce monitoring station of the Bohunice NPP: 25 years of continuous monthly measurements. Radiocarbon 57, 355–362.
- Povinec PP et al. 2013. Dispersion of Fukushima radionuclides in the global atmosphere and the ocean. Appl. Rad. Isotop. 81, 383-392
- Povinec PP et al. 2013. Cesium, iodine and tritium in NW Pacific waters – a comparison of the Fukushima impact with global fallout. Biogeosciences 10, 5481-5496
- Povinec PP et al. 2021. Radiocarbon dating of st. George's rotunda in Nitrianska Blatnica (Slovakia): International consortium results. Radiocarbon 63, 953–976.
