= Radioactive contamination =

Undesirable presence of radioactive substances

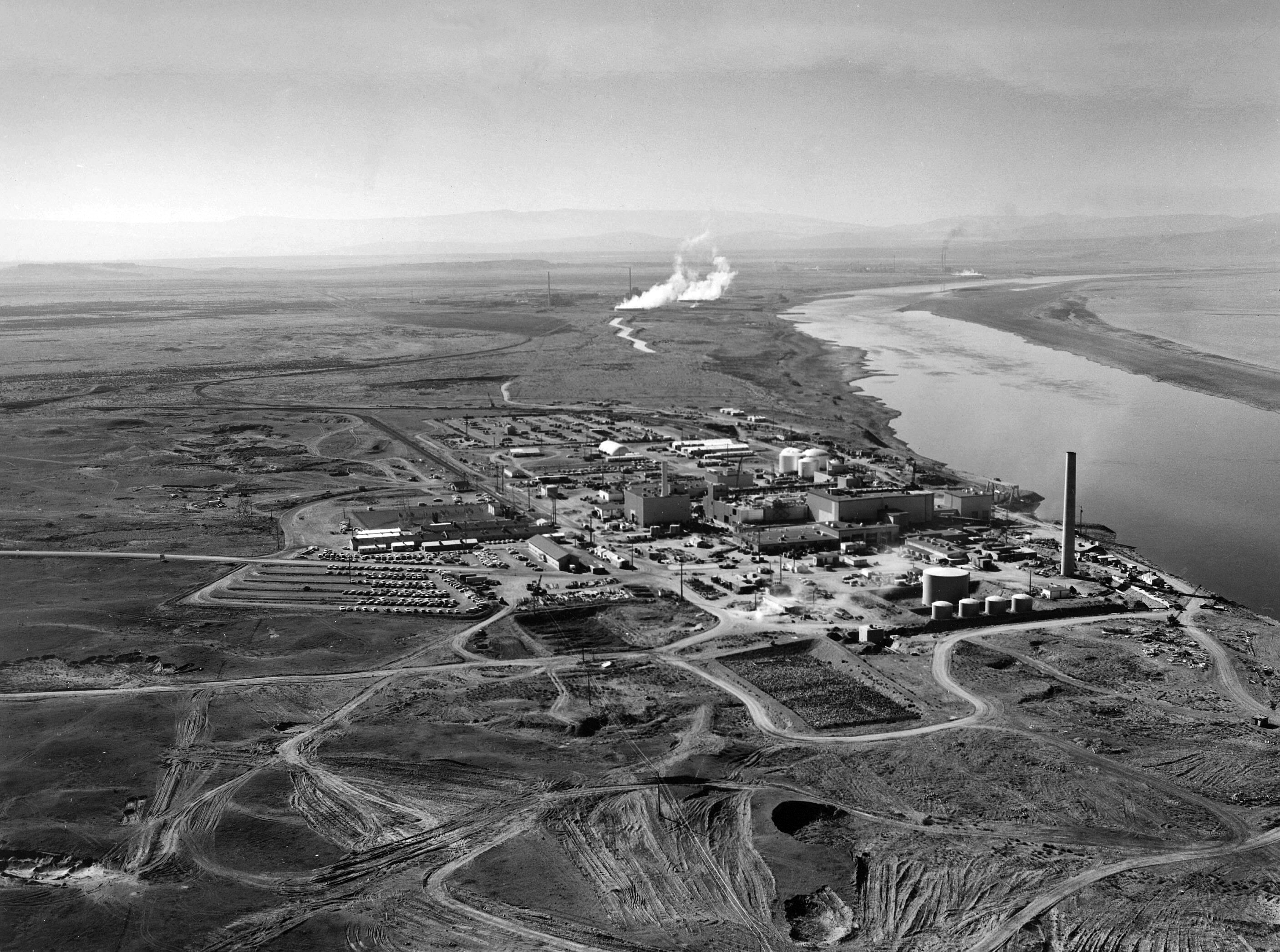
The Hanford site represents two-thirds of the United States' high-level radioactive waste by volume. Nuclear reactors line the riverbank at the Hanford Site along the Columbia River in January 1960.

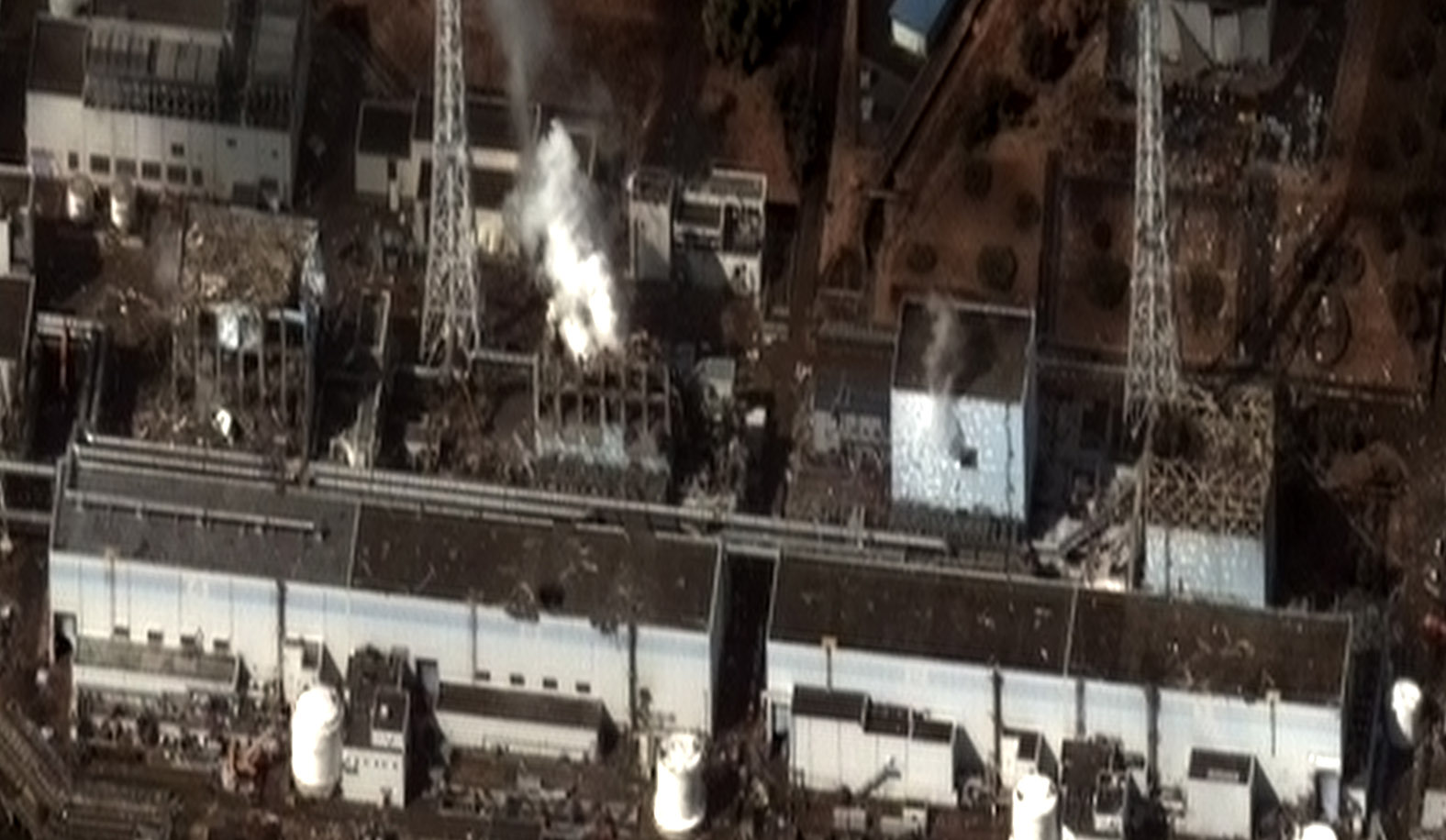
As of 2013, the Fukushima nuclear disaster site remains highly radioactive, with some 160,000 evacuees still living in temporary housing, and some land will be unfarmable for centuries. The difficult cleanup job will take 40 or more years, and cost tens of billions of dollars.

Radioactive contamination, also called radiological pollution, is the deposition of, or presence of radioactive substances on surfaces or within solids, liquids, or gases (including the human body), where their presence is unintended or undesirable (from the International Atomic Energy Agency (IAEA) definition).

Such contamination presents a hazard because the radioactive decay of the contaminants produces ionizing radiation (namely alpha, beta, gamma rays and free neutrons). The degree of hazard is determined by the concentration of the contaminants, the energy of the radiation being emitted, the type of radiation, and the proximity of the contamination to organs of the body. It is important to be clear that the contamination gives rise to the radiation hazard, and the terms "radiation" and "contamination" are not interchangeable.

The sources of radioactive pollution can be classified into two groups: natural and man-made. Following an atmospheric nuclear weapon discharge or a nuclear reactor containment breach, the air, soil, people, plants, and animals in the vicinity will become contaminated by nuclear fuel and fission products. A spilled vial of radioactive material like uranyl nitrate may contaminate the floor and any rags used to wipe up the spill. Cases of widespread radioactive contamination include the Bikini Atoll, the Rocky Flats Plant in Colorado, the area near the Fukushima Daiichi nuclear disaster, the area near the Chernobyl disaster, and the area near the Mayak disaster.

== Sources of contamination ==
Bomb pulse: the global airborne contamination by atmospheric nuclear weapon tests almost doubled the concentration of ^{14}C in the Northern Hemisphere. Plot of atmospheric ^{14}C, New Zealand and Austria. The New Zealand curve is representative for the Southern Hemisphere, the Austrian curve is representative for the Northern Hemisphere.

The sources of radioactive pollution can be natural or man-made.

Radioactive contamination can be due to a variety of causes. It may occur due to the release of radioactive gases, liquids or particles. For example, if a radionuclide used in nuclear medicine is spilled (accidentally or, as in the case of the Goiânia accident, through ignorance), the material could be spread by people as they walk around.

Radioactive contamination may also be an inevitable result of certain processes, such as the release of radioactive xenon in nuclear fuel reprocessing. In cases that radioactive material cannot be contained, it may be diluted to safe concentrations. For a discussion of environmental contamination by alpha emitters please see actinides in the environment.

Nuclear fallout is the distribution of radioactive contamination by the 520 atmospheric nuclear explosions that took place from the 1950s to the 1980s.

In nuclear accidents, a measure of the type and amount of radioactivity released, such as from a reactor containment failure, is known as the source term. The United States Nuclear Regulatory Commission defines this as "Types and amounts of radioactive or hazardous material released to the environment following an accident."

Contamination does not include residual radioactive material remaining at a site after the completion of decommissioning. Therefore, radioactive material in sealed and designated containers is not properly referred to as contamination, although the units of measurement might be the same.

=== Containment ===
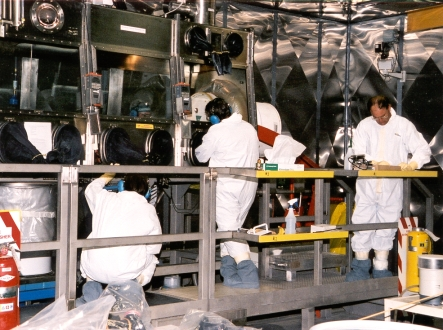
Large industrial glovebox in the nuclear industry

Containment is the primary way of preventing contamination from being released into the environment or coming into contact with or being ingested by humans.

Being within the intended Containment differentiates radioactive material from radioactive contamination. When radioactive materials are concentrated to a detectable level outside a containment, the area affected is generally referred to as "contaminated".

There are a large number of techniques for containing radioactive materials so that it does not spread beyond the containment and become contaminated. In the case of liquids, this is by the use of high integrity tanks or containers, usually with a sump system so that leakage can be detected by radiometric or conventional instrumentation.

Where the material is likely to become airborne, then extensive use is made of the glovebox, which is a common technique in hazardous laboratory and process operations in many industries. The gloveboxes are kept under slight negative pressure and the vent gas is filtered in high-efficiency filters, which are monitored by radiological instrumentation to ensure they are functioning correctly.

=== Naturally occurring radioactivity ===
A variety of radionuclides occur naturally in the environment. Elements like uranium and thorium, and their decay products, are present in rock and soil. Potassium-40, a primordial nuclide, makes up a small percentage of all potassium and is present in the human body. Other nuclides, like carbon-14, which is present in all living organisms, are continuously created by cosmic rays.

These levels of radioactivity pose little danger but can confuse measurement. A particular problem is encountered with naturally generated radon gas which can affect instruments that are set to detect contamination close to normal background levels and can cause false alarms. Because of this skill is required by the operator of radiological survey equipment to differentiate between background radiation and the radiation which emanates from contamination.

Naturally occurring radioactive materials (NORM) can be brought to the surface or concentrated by human activities such as mining, oil and gas extraction, and coal consumption.

== Control and monitoring of contamination ==
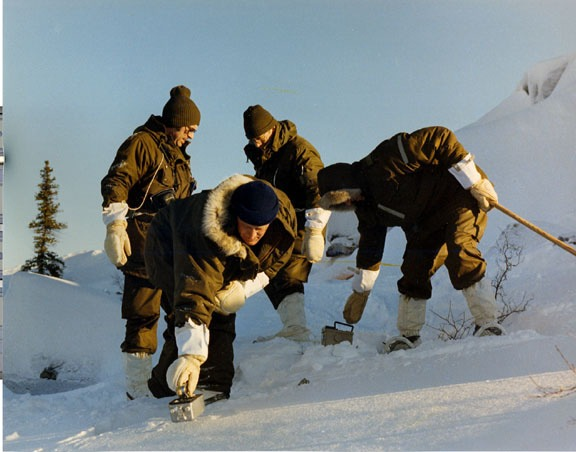
Geiger-Muller counters being used as gamma survey monitors, seeking radioactive satellite debris

Radioactive contamination may exist on surfaces or in volumes of material or air, and specialized techniques are used to measure the levels of contamination by detection of the emitted radiation.

=== Contamination monitoring ===
Contamination monitoring depends entirely upon the correct and appropriate deployment and utilisation of radiation monitoring instruments.

==== Surface contamination ====
Surface contamination may either be fixed or "free". In the case of fixed contamination, the radioactive material cannot by definition be spread, but its radiation is still measurable. In the case of free contamination, there is the hazard of contamination spread to other surfaces such as skin or clothing, or entrainment in the air. A concrete surface contaminated by radioactivity can be shaved to a specific depth, removing the contaminated material for disposal.

For occupational workers, controlled areas are established where there may be a contamination hazard. Access to such areas is controlled by a variety of barrier techniques, sometimes involving changes of clothing and footwear as required. The contamination within a controlled area is normally regularly monitored. Radiological protection instrumentation (RPI) plays a key role in monitoring and detecting any potential contamination spread, and combinations of hand held survey instruments and permanently installed area monitors such as Airborne particulate monitors and area gamma monitors are often installed. Detection and measurement of surface contamination of personnel and plant are normally by Geiger counter, scintillation counter or proportional counter. Proportional counters and dual phosphor scintillation counters can discriminate between alpha and beta contamination, but the Geiger counter cannot. Scintillation detectors are generally preferred for hand-held monitoring instruments and are designed with a large detection window to make monitoring of large areas faster. Geiger detectors tend to have small windows, which are more suited to small areas of contamination.

==== Exit monitoring ====
The spread of contamination by personnel exiting controlled areas in which nuclear material is used or processed is monitored by specialised installed exit control instruments such as frisk probes, hand contamination monitors and whole body exit monitors. These are used to check that persons exiting controlled areas do not carry contamination on their bodies or clothes.

In the United Kingdom, HSE has issued a user guidance note on selecting the correct portable radiation measurement instrument for the application concerned. This covers all radiation instrument technologies and is a useful comparative guide for selecting the correct technology for the contamination type.

The UK NPL publishes a guide on the alarm levels to be used with instruments for checking personnel exiting controlled areas in which contamination may be encountered. Surface contamination is usually expressed in units of radioactivity per unit of area for alpha or beta emitters. For SI, this is becquerels per square meter (or Bq/m^{2}). Other units such as picoCuries per 100 cm^{2} or disintegrations per minute per square centimeter (1 dpm/cm^{2} = 167 Bq/m^{2}) may be used.

=== Airborne contamination ===
The air can be contaminated with radioactive isotopes in particulate form, which poses a particular inhalation hazard. Respirators with suitable air filters or completely self-contained suits with their own air supply can mitigate these dangers.

Airborne contamination is measured by specialist radiological instruments that continuously pump the sampled air through a filter. Airborne particles accumulate on the filter and can be measured in a number of ways:

1. The filter paper is periodically manually removed to an instrument such as a "scaler" which measures any accumulated radioactivity.
2. The filter paper is static and is measured in situ by a radiation detector.
3. The filter is a slowly moving strip and is measured by a radiation detector. These are commonly called "moving filter" devices and automatically advance the filter to present a clean area for accumulation, and thereby allow a plot of airborne concentration over time.

Commonly a semiconductor radiation detection sensor is used that can also provide spectrographic information on the contamination being collected.

A particular problem with airborne contamination monitors designed to detect alpha particles is that naturally occurring radon can be quite prevalent and may appear as contamination when low contamination levels are being sought. Modern instruments consequently have "radon compensation" to overcome this effect.

=== Internal human contamination ===
Radioactive contamination can enter the body through ingestion, inhalation, absorption, or injection. This will result in a committed dose.

For this reason, it is important to use personal protective equipment when working with radioactive materials. Radioactive contamination may also be ingested as the result of eating contaminated plants and animals or drinking contaminated water or milk from exposed animals. Following a major contamination incident, all potential pathways of internal exposure should be considered.

== Decontamination ==
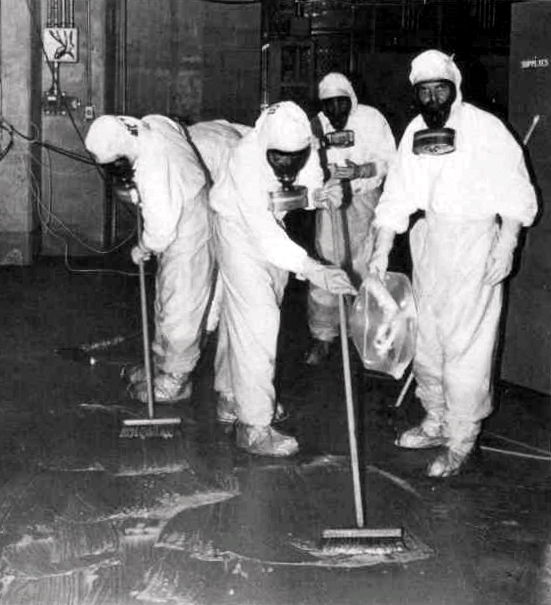
A clean-up crew working to remove radioactive contamination after the Three Mile Island accident.

Cleaning up contamination results in radioactive waste unless the radioactive material can be returned to commercial use by reprocessing. In some cases of large areas of contamination, the contamination may be mitigated by burying and covering the contaminated substances with concrete, soil, or rock to prevent further spread of the contamination to the environment. If a person's body is contaminated by ingestion or by injury and standard cleaning cannot reduce the contamination further, then the person may be permanently contaminated.

Contamination control products have been used by the U.S. Department of Energy (DOE) and the commercial nuclear industry for decades to minimize contamination on radioactive equipment and surfaces and fix contamination in place. "Contamination control products" is a broad term that includes fixatives, strippable coatings, and decontamination gels. A fixative product functions as a permanent coating to stabilize residual loose/transferable radioactive contamination by fixing it in place; this aids in preventing the spread of contamination and reduces the possibility of the contamination becoming airborne, reducing workforce exposure and facilitating future deactivation and decommissioning (D&D) activities. Strippable coating products are loosely adhered to paint-like films and are used for their decontamination abilities. They are applied to surfaces with loose/transferable radioactive contamination and then, once dried, are peeled off, which removes the loose/transferable contamination along with the product. The residual radioactive contamination on the surface is significantly reduced once the strippable coating is removed. Modern strippable coatings show high decontamination efficiency and can rival traditional mechanical and chemical decontamination methods. Decontamination gels work in much the same way as other strippable coatings. The results obtained through the use of contamination control products are variable and depend on the type of substrate, the selected contamination control product, the contaminants, and the environmental conditions (e.g., temperature, humidity, etc.).

Some of the largest areas committed to be decontaminated are in the Fukushima Prefecture, Japan. The national government is under pressure to clean up radioactivity due to the Fukushima nuclear accident of March 2011 from as much land as possible so that some of the 110,000 displaced people can return. Stripping out the key radioisotope threatening health (caesium-137) from low-level waste could also dramatically decrease the volume of waste requiring special disposal. A goal is to find techniques that might be able to strip out 80 to 95% of the caesium from contaminated soil and other materials, efficiently and without destroying the organic content in the soil. One being investigated is termed hydrothermal blasting. The caesium is broken away from soil particles and then precipitated with ferric ferricyanide (Prussian blue). It would be the only component of the waste requiring special burial sites. The aim is to get annual exposure from the contaminated environment down to one millisievert (mSv) above background. The most contaminated area where radiation doses are greater than 50 mSv/year must remain off-limits, but some areas that are currently less than 5 mSv/year may be decontaminated allowing 22,000 residents to return.

To help protect people living in geographical areas which have been radioactively contaminated, the International Commission on Radiological Protection has published a guide: "Publication 111 – Application of the Commission's Recommendations to the Protection of People Living in Long-term Contaminated Areas after a Nuclear Accident or a Radiation Emergency".

== Contamination hazards ==
Periodic table with elements colored according to the half-life of their most stable isotope. Elements which contain at least one stable isotope. Radioactive elements: the most stable isotope is very long-lived, with half-life of over four million years. Radioactive elements: the most stable isotope has half-life between 800 and 34.000 years. Radioactive elements: the most stable isotope has half-life between one day and 130 years. Highly radioactive elements: the most stable isotope has half-life between several minutes and one day. Extremely radioactive elements: the most stable isotope has half-life less than several minutes.

=== Low-level contamination ===
The hazards to people and the environment from radioactive contamination depend on the nature of the radioactive contaminant, the level of contamination, and the extent of the spread of contamination. Low levels of radioactive contamination pose little risk, but can still be detected by radiation instrumentation. If a survey or map is made of a contaminated area, random sampling locations may be labeled with their activity in becquerels or curies on contact. Low levels may be reported in counts per minute using a scintillation counter.

In the case of low-level contamination by isotopes with a short half-life, the best course of action may be to simply allow the material to naturally decay. Longer-lived isotopes should be cleaned up and properly disposed of because even a very low level of radiation can be life-threatening when in long exposure to it.

Facilities and physical locations that are deemed to be contaminated may be cordoned off by a health physicist and labeled "Contaminated area." Persons coming near such an area would typically require anti-contamination clothing ("anti-Cs").

=== High-level contamination ===
High levels of contamination may pose major risks to people and the environment. People can be exposed to potentially lethal radiation levels, both externally and internally, from the spread of contamination following an accident (or a deliberate initiation) involving large quantities of radioactive material. The biological effects of external exposure to radioactive contamination are generally the same as those from an external radiation source not involving radioactive materials, such as x-ray machines, and are dependent on the absorbed dose.

When radioactive contamination is being measured or mapped in situ, any location that appears to be a point source of radiation is likely to be heavily contaminated. A highly contaminated location is colloquially referred to as a "hot spot." On a map of a contaminated place, hot spots may be labeled with their "on contact" dose rate in mSv/h. In a contaminated facility, hot spots may be marked with a sign, shielded with bags of lead shot, or cordoned off with warning tape containing the radioactive trefoil symbol.

The radiation warning symbol (trefoil)

Alpha radiation consists of helium-4 nucleus and is readily stopped by a sheet of paper. Beta radiation, consisting of electrons, is halted by an aluminium plate. Gamma radiation is eventually absorbed as it penetrates a dense material. Lead is good at absorbing gamma radiation, due to its density.

The hazard from contamination is the emission of ionizing radiation. The principal radiations which will be encountered are alpha, beta and gamma, but these have quite different characteristics. They have widely differing penetrating powers and radiation effects, and the accompanying diagram shows the penetration of these radiations in simple terms. For an understanding of the different ionising effects of these radiations and the weighting factors applied, see the article on absorbed dose.

Radiation monitoring involves the measurement of radiation dose or radionuclide contamination for reasons related to the assessment or control of exposure to radiation or radioactive substances, and the interpretation of the results. The methodological and technical details of the design and operation of environmental radiation monitoring programmes and systems for different radionuclides, environmental media and types of facility are given in IAEA Safety Standards Series No. RS–G-1.8 and in IAEA Safety Reports Series No. 64.

== Health effects of contamination ==
=== Biological effects ===
Radioactive contamination by definition emits ionizing radiation, which can irradiate the human body from an external or internal origin.

==== External irradiation ====
This is due to radiation from contamination located outside the human body. The source can be in the vicinity of the body or can be on the skin surface. The level of health risk is dependent on duration and the type and strength of irradiation. Penetrating radiation such as gamma rays, X-rays, neutrons or beta particles pose the greatest risk from an external source. Low penetrating radiation such as alpha particles have a low external risk due to the shielding effect of the top layers of skin. See the article on sievert for more information on how this is calculated.

==== Internal irradiation ====
Radioactive contamination can be ingested into the human body if it is airborne or is taken in as contamination of food or drink, and will irradiate the body internally. The art and science of assessing internally generated radiation dose is Internal dosimetry.

The biological effects of ingested radionuclides depend greatly on the activity, the biodistribution, and the removal rates of the radionuclide, which in turn depends on its chemical form, the particle size, and route of entry. Effects may also depend on the chemical toxicity of the deposited material, independent of its radioactivity. Some radionuclides may be generally distributed throughout the body and rapidly removed, as is the case with tritiated water.

Some organs concentrate certain elements and hence radionuclide variants of those elements. This action may lead to much lower removal rates. For instance, the thyroid gland takes up a large percentage of any iodine that enters the body. Large quantities of inhaled or ingested radioactive iodine may impair or destroy the thyroid, while other tissues are affected to a lesser extent. Radioactive iodine-131 is a common fission product; it was a major component of the radioactivity released from the Chernobyl disaster, leading to nine fatal cases of pediatric thyroid cancer and hypothyroidism. On the other hand, radioactive iodine is used in the diagnosis and treatment of many diseases of the thyroid precisely because of the thyroid's selective uptake of iodine.

The radiation risk proposed by the International Commission on Radiological Protection (ICRP) predicts that an effective dose of one sievert (100 rem) carries a 5.5% chance of developing cancer. Such a risk is the sum of both internal and external radiation doses.

The ICRP states "Radionuclides incorporated in the human body irradiate the tissues over time periods determined by their physical half-life and their biological retention within the body. Thus they may give rise to doses to body tissues for many months or years after the intake. The need to regulate exposures to radionuclides and the accumulation of radiation dose over extended periods of time has led to the definition of committed dose quantities". The ICRP further states "For internal exposure, committed effective doses are generally determined from an assessment of the intakes of radionuclides from bioassay measurements or other quantities (e.g., activity retained in the body or in daily excreta). The radiation dose is determined from the intake using recommended dose coefficients".

The ICRP defines two dose quantities for individual committed dose:

Committed equivalent dose, H _{T}(t) is the time integral of the equivalent dose rate in a particular tissue or organ that will be received by an individual following intake of radioactive material into the body by a Reference Person, where t is the integration time in years. This refers specifically to the dose in a specific tissue or organ, in a similar way to external equivalent dose.

Committed effective dose, E(t) is the sum of the products of the committed organ or tissue equivalent doses and the appropriate tissue weighting factors W_{T}, where t is the integration time in years following the intake. The commitment period is taken to be 50 years for adults, and to age 70 years for children. This refers specifically to the dose to the whole body, in a similar way to external effective dose.

=== Social and psychological effects ===
A 2015 report in Lancet explained that serious impacts of nuclear accidents were often not directly attributable to radiation exposure, but rather social and psychological effects. The consequences of low-level radiation are often more psychological than radiological. Because damage from very low-level radiation cannot be detected, people exposed to it are left in anguished uncertainty about what will happen to them. Many believe they have been fundamentally contaminated for life and may refuse to have children for fear of birth defects. They may be shunned by others in their community who fear a sort of mysterious contagion.

Forced evacuation from a radiological or nuclear accident may lead to social isolation, anxiety, depression, psychosomatic medical problems, reckless behavior, even suicide. Such was the outcome of the 1986 Chernobyl nuclear disaster in Ukraine. A comprehensive 2005 study concluded that "the mental health impact of Chernobyl is the largest public health problem unleashed by the accident to date". Frank N. von Hippel, a U.S. scientist, commented on 2011 Fukushima nuclear disaster, saying that "fear of ionizing radiation could have long-term psychological effects on a large portion of the population in the contaminated areas". Evacuation and long-term displacement of affected populations create problems for many people, especially the elderly and hospital patients.

Such great psychological danger does not accompany other materials that put people at risk of cancer and other deadly illness. Visceral fear is not widely aroused by, for example, the daily emissions from coal burning, although, as a National Academy of Sciences study found, this causes 10,000 premature deaths a year in the US population of 317,413,000. Medical errors leading to death in U.S. hospitals are estimated to be between 44,000 and 98,000. It is "only nuclear radiation that bears a huge psychological burden – for it carries a unique historical legacy".

== See also ==
- Chemical hazard
- Criticality accident
- Human decontamination
- Lists of nuclear disasters and radioactive incidents
- Low-background steel
- Nuclear and radiation accidents
- Nuclear debate (disambiguation)
- Nuclear power
- Radiation biology
- Radiation exposure (disambiguation)
- Radiophobia
- Relative biological effectiveness
- Rongelap Atoll
- Soviet submarine K-19
- Washdown
- Category:Deaths by acute radiation syndrome
