= Sergey Romanov =

- Born: Sergey Anatolyevich Romanov; 20 September 1958 (age 67); Buran village, Markakolsky district, East Kazakhstan Region, Kazakh SSR, USSR
- Education: Moscow Aviation Institute
- Awards: See list: Russian Federation National Award in Science and Technology (2002); Medal of the Order "For Merit to the Fatherland" (2010)
- Scientific career
- Fields: internal dosimetry; radiation protection; microdosimetry
- Institutions: MKB Raduga (1982-1985); Mayak (1985); Southern Urals Biophysics Institute (since 1985)
- Thesis: Microdistribution of plutonium in the lungs as a basis for correction of dosimetric models (2003)
- Doctoral advisor: Valentin Fedorovich Khokhryakov

Sergey Anatolyevich Romanov (Russian: Сергей Анатольевич Романов), born 20 September 1958, is a Russian scientist, internal dosimetry and radiation protection specialist, PhD in biology (2003). He served as Director in the Southern Urals Biophysics Institute from 1997 to 2024. Since October 2, 2024 he is Director Adviser. He is the author and coauthor of more than 150 research papers.

== Education and early life ==
Sergey Romanov was born on 20 September 1958 in Buran village in Markakolsky district of East Kazakhstan Region, Kazakh SSR, USSR, to the Romanov family, Anatoly Mikhailovich and Maria Timofeevna. In 1969 his family had moved to Kimry, Tver oblast, where he graduated from a high school and that year entered the Faculty of Applied Mathematics at Sergo Ordzhonikidze Moscow Aviation Institute (MAI).

== Career and research ==
In 1982, he graduated from MAI majoring in Applied Mathematics. He began his career as an engineer at the machine-construction design office "Raduga" in Dubna, Moscow oblast. By the end of 1985 he had moved to Ozyorsk where he had started his career at one of the biggest USSR nuclear facilities Mayak PA as a control and testing instrumentation mechanic; six months later he had moved to the Internal Dosimetry Laboratory of the Branch #1 of Biophysics Institute. He worked as a senior laboratory assistant (1986), then as a senior engineer, the 1st category engineer, a leading programming engineer, the head of the group, he was eventually appointed as Director of the Branch (1997-2024).

He earned his PhD in 2003 at the Biophysics Institute of the Russian Academy of Sciences (Siberian Branch) with a dissertation on microdistribution of plutonium in the lungs as a basis for correction of dosimetric models.

Member of the Russian delegation and expert in the United Nations Scientific Committee on the Effects of Atomic Radiation (UNSCEAR) (since 2008), member of the Main Commission of the International Commission on Radiological Protection (since 2013), member of the Russian Scientific Commission on Radiological Protection. Expert of the Federal Target Program "Providing nuclear and radiation safety for 2016-2020 and for the period up to 2030" (FTP NRS-2). He is the member of the editorial board of Radiation and Environmental Biophysics, "Radiation Safety Issues", "Emergency medicine".

From 2004 to 2012 he taught at South Ural State University (Ozyorsk Branch) as head of Biophysics special Chair.

Sergey Romanov has the rank of senior international master, SIM (2000) in correspondence chess.

== h-index ==
His h-index in the International bibliographic and reference database Scopus as of 05.11.2024 reaches 20.

== Awards and honours ==
Sergey Romanov is the recipient of the 2002 Russian Federation National Award in Science and Technology, awarded the II Degree Medal of the Order "For Merit to the Fatherland" (2010).

== Personal life ==
He lives in Ozersk, Chelyabinsk oblast, Russia. Married.

== Publications ==
Some of the most cited publications:

=== 2010s ===
- Uyba, V.V., Akleyev, A.V., Azizova, T.V., Ivanov, V.K., Karpikova, L.A., Kiselev, S.M., Mikheyenko, S.G., Romanov, S.A., Takhauov, R.M., Usoltsev, V.Yu., Shinkarev, S.M. (2019). "Results of the 66-th session of the united nations scientific Committee on the Effects of the atomic Radiation (UNSCEAR) (Vienna, 10–14 June, 2019)". Medical Radiology and Radiation Safety. 64 (5): 81–88. doi:10.12737/1024-6177-2019-64-5-81-88. ISSN 1024-6177. S2CID 241661479.
- Vasilenko, E.K., Aladova, E.E., Vostrotin, V.V., Sokolnikov, M.E., Ephimov, A.V., Romanov, S.A. (2019). "Risk-oriented approach to monitoring for internal exposure to incorporated plutonium". Radiation and Risk. 28 (2): 61–74. doi:10.21870/0131-3878-2019-28-2-61-74. ISSN 2412-950X.
- Uyba, V.V., Akleyev, A.V., Azizova, T.V., Ivanov, V.K., Ilyasov, D.F., Karpikova, L.A., Kiselev, S.M., Kryshev, A.I., Mikheyenko, S.G., Romanov, S.A., Usoltsev, V.Yu., Shinkarev, S.M. (2018). "Results of the 65th session of the united nations scientific committee on the effects of the atomic radiation (UNSCEAR) (Vienna, 11–14 June, 2018)". Medical Radiology and Radiation Safety. 63 (5): 77–88. doi:10.12737/article_5bc897fcddd2d8.49109633. ISSN 1024-6177. S2CID 81912080.
- Degteva, M.O., Tolstykh, E.I., Suslova, K.G., Romanov, S.A., Akleyev, A.V. (2018). "Analysis of the results of long-lived radionuclide body burden monitoring in residents of the Urals region". Radiatsionnaya Gygiena. 11 (3): 30–39. doi:10.21514/1998-426X-2018-11-3-30-39. ISSN 1998-426X.
- Hiller, M.M., Woda, C., Bougrov, N.G., Degteva, M.O., Ivanov, O., Ulanovsky, A., Romanov, S. (2017). "External dose reconstruction for the former village of Metlino (Techa River, Russia) based on environmental surveys, luminescence measurements, and radiation transport modelling". Radiation and Environmental Biophysics. 56 (2): 139–159. Bibcode:2017REBio..56..139H. doi:10.1007/s00411-017-0688-3. ISSN 0301-634X. PMID 28374124. S2CID 253886159.
- Vasilenko, E.K., Sokolnikov, M.E., Vostrotin, V.V., Aladova, E.E., Ephimov, A.V., Romanov, S.A. (2017). "Drawbacks of current dose limits on intake for plutonium". Radiation and Risk. 26 (3): 46–54. doi:10.21870/0131-3878-2017-26-3-46-54. ISSN 2412-950X.

=== 2020s ===
- Clement, C., Rühm, W., Harrison, J., Applegate, K., Cool, D., Larsson, C.-M., Cousins, C., Lochard, J., Bouffler, S., Cho, K., Kai, M., Laurier, D., Liu, S., Romanov, S. (2021). "Keeping the ICRP recommendations fit for purpose". Journal of Radiological Protection. 41 (4): 1390–1409. Bibcode:2021JRP....41.1390C. doi:10.1088/1361-6498/ac1611. ISSN 0952-4746. PMID 34284364.
- Vasilenko, E.K., Aladova, E.E., Gorelov, M.V., Knyazev, V.A., Kolupaev, D.V., Romanov, S.A. (2020). "The radiological environment at the Mayak PA site and radiation doses to individuals involved in emergency and remediation operations after the 'Kyshtym Accident' in 1957". Journal of Radiological Protection. 40 (2): R23 – R45. Bibcode:2020JRP....40R..23V. doi:10.1088/1361-6498/ab8711. ISSN 0952-4746. PMID 32463801. S2CID 218982962.
- Woda, C., Hiller, M., Ulanowski, A., Bugrov, N.G., Degteva, M.O., Ivanov, O., Romanov, S., Tschiersch, J., Shinonaga, T. (2020). "Luminescence dosimetry for evaluation of the external exposure in Metlino, upper Techa River valley, due to the shore of the Metlinsky Pond: A feasibility study". Journal of Environmental Radioactivity. 214–215 106152. Bibcode:2020JEnvR.21406152W. doi:10.1016/j.jenvrad.2019.106152. ISSN 0265-931X. PMID 32063284.
- Romanov, S.A., Efimov, V., Aladova, E., Suslova, G., Kuznetsova, I.S., Sokolova, A., Khokhryakov, V.V., Sypko, S.A., Ishunina, M.V., Khokhryakov, V.F. (2020). "Plutonium production and particles incorporation into the human body". Journal of Environmental Radioactivity. 211 106073. Bibcode:2020JEnvR.21106073R. doi:10.1016/j.jenvrad.2019.106073. ISSN 0265-931X. PMID 31605814.
