= Institute of Radiation Problems =

Azerbaijani research institute

- Established: 2002
- Head: Islam Mustafayev
- Address: Baku, B. Vahabzade str., 9 AZ 1143
- Location: Azerbaijan
- Website: http://irp.science.az/?l=/lang,en/

Institute of Radiation Problems is a part of the Azerbaijan National Academy of Sciences.

== History ==
The Radiation Research Sector of the Academy of Sciences of Azerbaijan (ANAS) was established by decision №27 of the State Scientific and Technical Committee under the Council of Ministers of the USSR, dated May 21, 1969 for the purpose of developing scientific and scientific-technical bases of peaceful use of nuclear energy, impact of various ionizing rays on substances, environment, creatures, physical and chemical problems of energy conversion, radioecology and radiation safety in Azerbaijan.

After Azerbaijan Republic gained its sovereignty, problems of radiation and nuclear safety, radioecology, and peaceful use of nuclear energy have become more actual issues. Therefore, the Institute of Radiation Problems has been established on the basis of the Radiation Research Sector of ANAS by the decision №27 of the Cabinet of Ministers of the Azerbaijan Republic, dated May 21, 2002.

The Institute of Radiation Problems is the only scientific institution in the ANAS system that conducts fundamental scientific and technical research in the field of peaceful use of nuclear energy, radiation safety, radioecology, physical and technical problems of power engineering, non-conventional energy conversion processes, radiation effects in solids, and radiation material sciences and carries out domestic and international information exchange.

The radiation research journal of the Institute was registered by the Ministry of Justice of the Republic of Azerbaijan on February 14, 2014, under registration number 3858. It has been published twice a year by the Institute of Radiation Problems since 2014.

The journal serves as a platform to publicize the latest scientific achievements in the field of radiation research, both locally and globally. Published entirely in English, the journal features cutting-edge advancements and findings from both domestic and international researchers.

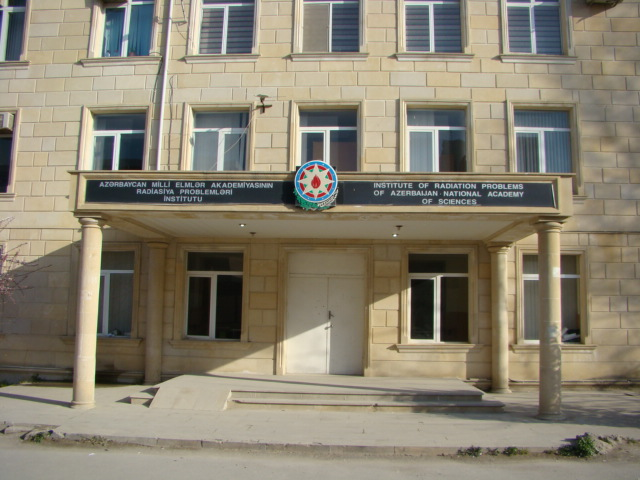
Entry of the Institute of Radiation Problems

== Main activities ==
- Use of Nuclear Energy for Peaceful Purposes; Radiation Materials Science and Radiation Physics; Nuclear and Radiation Safety (Ecology, Radioecology, Radiobiology); Physical and chemical problems of energy conversion; conversion of renewable energy types.
- Main scientific results obtained by the organization in the last five years: - Radiation-stimulating processes in solids
- It is experimentally revealed that the radiation-heterogeneous decomposition center of water on the surface of zirconium is charged;
- Formation and recombination regularities of luminescence centers under the influence of γ – rays in layered GaS monocrystals have been defined;
- The relaxor ferroelectric state of TllnS_{2} crystal has been obtained under the influence of γ - rays (D> 300 Mrad);
- Obtaining and studying the energy converters based on polymer composite, nanocomposite, and A_{IV}B_{VI} compounds:
- It has been revealed a special composite system in which the intensity of the luminescence rays, occurring at 0.5-1.5 Mrad values of absorption doses of γ - rays at Tg = 165K, depends on dose;
- Physical and chemical regularities of liquefaction and gasification of solid organic wastes by using renewable energy sources and radiation have been determined;
- For the first time, crude oil is prepared for processing using solar energy facilities in oilfield;
- Stimulation of radiolytic transformation processes of the air (N_{2}O) by the disperse iron-delta-electrons has been found for the first time.
- Investigation of radioecological and physical-chemical bases of the impact of the energy-fuel complex on the environment.
- It has been determined that, critic concentration, which provides radiation-chemical decomposition process of hydrocarbon in water to go in a chain regime, is 10-3%, and it has been shown that oxygen dissolved in water increases the rate of this process.

== Basic scientific research directions ==
- Use of nuclear energy for peaceful purposes;
- Radiation Materials Science and Radiation Physics;
- Nuclear and Radiation Safety (Ecology, Radioecology, Radiobiology);
- Physical and chemical problems of energy conversion. Alternative energy.
