= Terrestrial radiation =

Terrestrial radiation may refer to:

- Terrestrial radiation, electromagnetic thermal radiation emitted by Earth's surface
- Terrestrial background radiation, environmental radioactivity in the human environment
