= Pizhansky District =

Pizhansky District Пижанский район (Russian)
- District
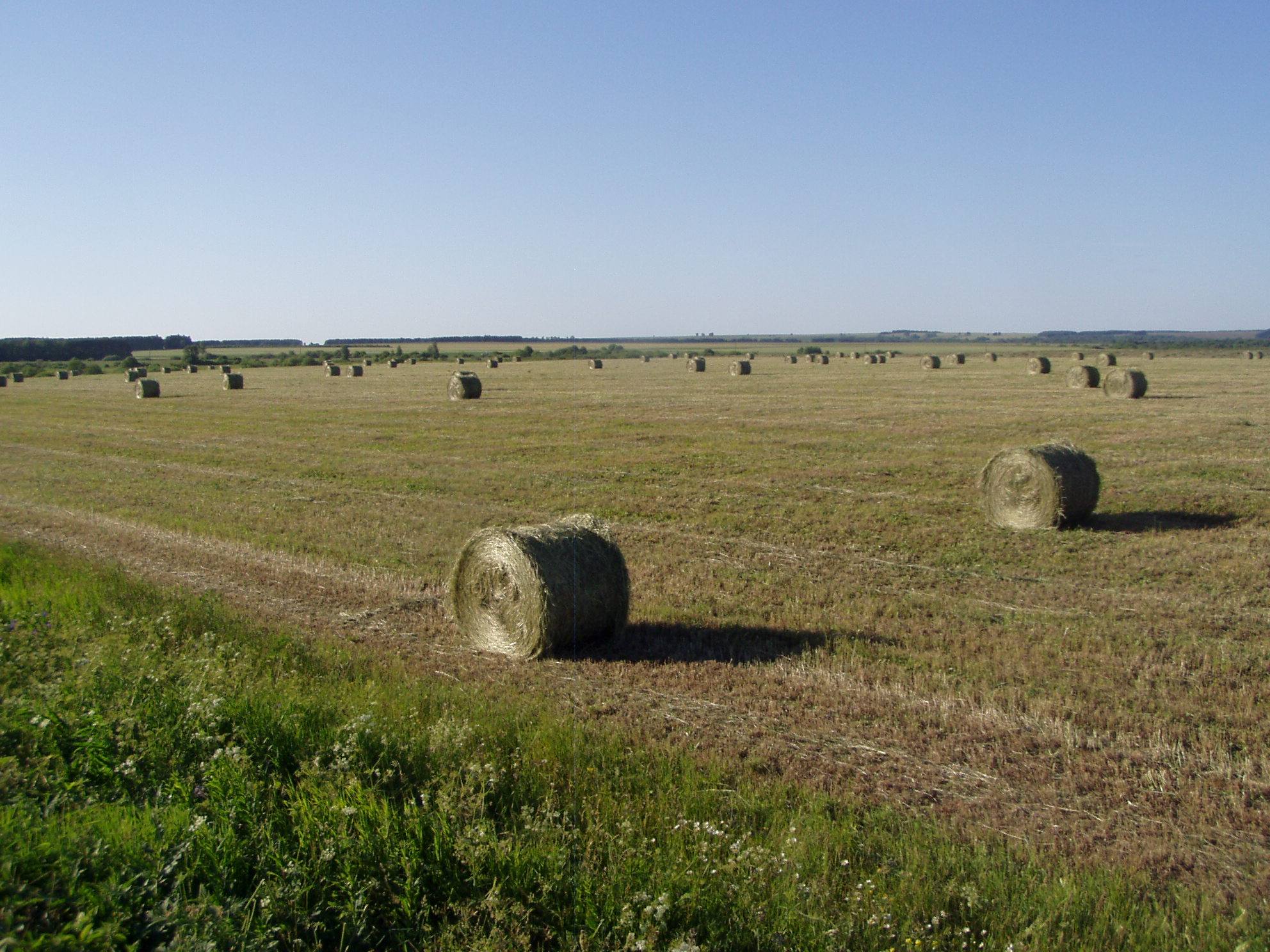
- A field near Pizhanka in Pizhansky District

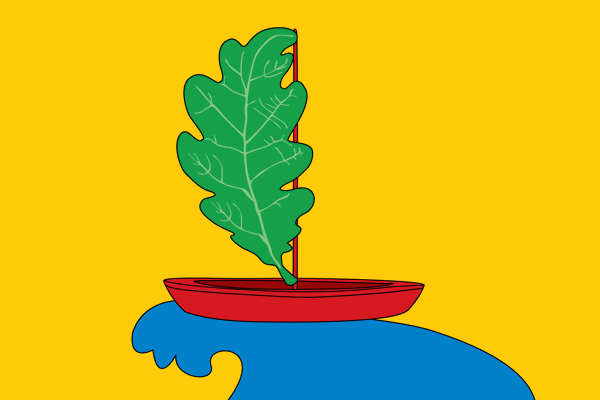
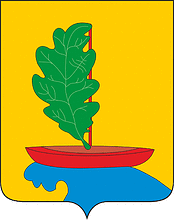
- Flag Coat of arms
- Location of Pizhansky District in Kirov Oblast
- Coordinates: 57°27′32″N 48°32′05″E
- Country: Russia
- Federal subject: Kirov Oblast
- Established: 15 July 1929
- Administrative center: Pizhanka

Area
  - Total: 1,160.2 km^{2} (448.0 sq mi)

Population (2010 Census)
  - Total: 11,242
  - Density: 9.6897/km^{2} (25.096/sq mi)
  - Urban: 34.5%
  - Rural: 65.5%

Administrative structure
  - Administrative divisions: 1 Urban-type settlements, 5 Rural okrugs
  - Inhabited localities: 1 urban-type settlements, 109 rural localities

Municipal structure
  - Municipally incorporated as: Pizhansky Municipal District
  - Municipal divisions: 1 urban settlements, 5 rural settlements
- Time zone: UTC+3 (MSK)
- OKTMO ID: 33531000
- Website: https://pizhanka-r43.gosuslugi.ru/

Pizhansky District (Russian: Пижа́нский райо́н) is an administrative and municipal district (raion), one of the thirty-nine in Kirov Oblast, Russia. It is located in the southwest of the oblast. The area of the district is 1,160.2 square kilometers (448.0 sq mi). Its administrative center is the urban locality (an urban-type settlement) of Pizhanka. Population: 11,242 (2010 census); 13,580 (2002 Census); 15,220 (1989 Soviet census). The population of Pizhanka accounts for 34.5% of the district's total population.

== People ==
- Stepan Repin (1906-1982)
