= Radiation Protection Dosimetry =

- Discipline: Radiobiology
- Language: English
- Edited by: Magnus Båth

Publication details
- History: 1981–present
- Publisher: Oxford University Press
- Frequency: Monthly
- Impact factor: 0.773 (2019)

Standard abbreviations
- ISO 4: Radiat. Prot. Dosim.

Indexing
- CODEN: RPDODE
- ISSN: 0144-8420 (print); 1742-3406 (web)
- LCCN: 82643551
- OCLC no.: 56561107

Links
- Journal homepage; Online access

Radiation Protection Dosimetry is a monthly peer-reviewed scientific journal covering radiation dosimetry, among others personal and environmental dosimetry, external and internal dosimetry, radioecology as well as radiation monitoring, for ionizing radiation and where applicable also for non-ionizing radiation. The editor-in-chief is Magnus Båth (University of Gothenburg and Sahlgrenska University Hospital). Associate Editors are the following persons:

- Liz Ainsbury (UK Health Security Agency)
- Anja Almén (Lund University, Sweden)
- Rainer Gellermann (Nuclear Control & Consulting GmbH, Germany)
- Yigal S. Horowitz (Ben Gurion University of the Negev, Israel)
- Sakae Kinase (Japan Atomic Energy Agency)
- Simone Kodlulovich Renha (National Nuclear Energy Commission, Brazil)
- Oliver Meisenberg (Federal Office for Radiation Protection, Germany)
- Azadeh Peyman (UK Health Security Agency)
- Brian Quinn (Memorial Sloan Kettering Cancer Center, USA)
- David J. Thomas (National Physical Laboratory, USA)

According to the Journal Citation Reports, the journal had a 2019 impact factor of 0.773.

The most notable articles that were published in Radiation Protection Dosimetry comprise the following papers:

- M.-D. Dorrian, M. R. Bailey: Particle-size distributions of radioactive aerosols measured in workplaces. Radiation Protection Dosimetry 60 (1995), pp. 119–133. doi:10.1093/oxfordjournals.rpd.a031892. This literature survey on the size distribution of radioactive aerosol particles at various workplaces influenced recommendations for dosimetry following the inhalation of radioactive material issued by the International Commission on Radiological Protection ICRP.
- Mark S. Akselrod, V. S. Kortov, D. J. Kravetsky, V. I. Gottlib: Highly Sensitive Thermoluminescent Anion-Defect Alpha-Al2O3:C Single Crystal Detectors. Radiation Protection Dosimetry 33 (1990), pp. 119–122, doi:10.1093/rpd/33.1-4.119. In this publication, which was referenced more than 300 times, a new material for thermoluminescent dosimeters was introduced.
- M. Pelliccioni: Overview of fluence-to-effective dose and fluence-to ambient dose equivalent conversion coefficients for high energy radiation calculated using the FLUKA code. Radiation Protection Dosimetry 88 (2000), pp. 279–297. doi:10.1093/oxfordjournals.rpd.a033046. In this publication, which was referenced more than 270 times, important principles for the calculation and measurement of the effective dose following exposure to very highly energetic particles were summarized.
