= Pizhanka =

Pizhanka Пижанка
- Urban-type settlement
- Interactive map of Pizhanka
- Location of Pizhanka Pizhanka (Kirov Oblast)
- Coordinates: 57.4603°N 48.5363°E
- Country: Russia
- Federal subject: Kirov Oblast
- Administrative district: Pizhansky District
- Founded: 1693

Population (2010 Census)
  - Total: 3,875
  - Estimate (2025): 3,466 (−10.6%)
- Time zone: UTC+3 (MSK)
- Postal code: 613380
- OKTMO ID: 33631151051

Pizhanka (Russian: Пижанка) is an urban locality (an urban-type settlement) in Pizhansky District of Kirov Oblast, Russia. Population: 3,875 (2010 census); 4,022 (2002 census); 4,164 (1989 Soviet census).
