= Mikhail Radchenko =

Russian footballer

Personal information
- Full name: Mikhail Yuryevich Radchenko
- Date of birth: 5 August 1996 (age 30)
- Place of birth: Moscow, Russia
- Height: 1.80 m (5 ft 11 in)
- Position: Defender

Youth career
- 2014–2015: Bologna

Senior career*
Years	Team	Apps	(Gls)
2015	Romagna Centro	1	(0)
2015	Bellaria Igea Marina	10	(1)
2016	Folgore Veregra	9	(0)
2016–2019	FYA Riccione		
2020	Naftan Novopolotsk	8	(0)
2020	TSK-Tavriya Simferopol	13	(0)
2021	Torpedo Kutaisi	1	(0)
2021	Dinamo Zugdidi	14	(2)
2022–2023	Dynamo Stavropol	18	(1)
2023–2024	Ts-1 Lobnya (amateur)		
2024–	Centaur Moscow (amateur)		
- * Club domestic league appearances and goals

Mikhail Yuryevich Radchenko (Russian: Михаил Юрьевич Радченко; born 5 August 1996) is a Russian footballer who plays as a defender.

== Career ==
Before the second half of 2014/15, Radchenko signed for Romagna Centro in the Italian fourth division from the youth academy of Italian Serie A side Bologna.

In 2018, he started playing college soccer in the United States.

Before the 2020 season, he signed for Belarusian First League club Naftan.

In 2020, Radchenko signed for TSK-Tavriya in Crimea.
