= Dmitry Rodin =

Red Army junior lieutenant

Dmitry Ivanovich Rodin
- Дмитрий Ильич Родин
- Born: 21 July 1912; Novostreletskaya, Pronsky Uyezd, Ryazan Governorate, Russian Empire
- Died: 6 June 1992 (aged 79); Moscow, Russia
- Military career
- Allegiance: Soviet Union
- Branch: Red Army
- Service years: 1935–1938; 1941–1945
- Rank: Junior lieutenant
- Unit: 57th Guards Rifle Division
- Conflicts: World War II; Battle of Moscow; Demyansk Pocket; Battle of Stalingrad; Nikopol-Krivoy Rog Offensive; Odessa Offensive; Lublin-Brest Offensive
- Awards: Hero of the Soviet Union

Dmitry Ivanovich Rodin (Russian: Дмитрий Ильич Родин; 21 July 1912 – 6 June 1992) was a Red Army junior lieutenant and Hero of the Soviet Union. Rodin was awarded the title for his leadership of a platoon during the Lublin–Brest Offensive, during which he was seriously wounded for the sixth time. As a result of this, Rodin spent the rest of the war in the hospital and was discharged in April 1945. Postwar, he worked as an engineer in the Ministry of Railways design and research institute.

== Early life and Interwar period ==
Rodin was born on 21 July 1912 in the village of Novostreletskaya in Ryazan Governorate to a working-class family. In 1925, he graduated from 6th grade. In 1932, he moved to Moscow and worked as a mechanic in a tram depot. He was drafted into the Red Army in October 1935 and served with the 89th Separate Squadron at Kubinka. Rodin joined the Communist Party of the Soviet UnionIduring the year. In November 1938, he was demobilized. Between December 1938 and July 1941 he worked with the Militsiya (civilian police) in Moscow.

== World War II ==
In July 1941, Rodin volunteered for the Red Army and served in a Moscow Narodnoe Opolcheniye (People's Militia) battalion. In October, he became a squad leader in the 3rd Moscow Communist Rifle Division, which became the 130th Rifle Division in January 1942. He fought in the Battle of Moscow and then in the Demyansk Pocket. On 20 February, he was seriously wounded near Staraya Russa and sent to a hospital in Ivanovo. After recovering in April, Rodin became a squad leader in a reserve rifle regiment in May at Chebarkul. In July, he graduated from courses for junior lieutenants and became an officer. After graduation, Rodin was sent to the 118th Fortified Area of the Southwestern Front and became a gun commander. He fought in the defense of Stalingrad and on 11 July was wounded near Chertkovo. Rodin spent up to January 1943 in a hospital at Ryazan.

In March 1943, Rodin became a platoon commander in the 53rd Rifle Division's 475th Rifle Regiment. He fought in the Donbas and in the Izyum-Barvenkovo Offensive. On 2 April, he was wounded in the left arm in Izium and was in the hospital until May. Returning to command of the platoon, he was wounded in the leg on 21 July and spent until November in a Saratov hospital. In November and December, Rodin was a platoon commander in the 18th Separate Rifle Regiment of Reserve Officers. In December he was sent to the front and became a platoon commander in the 31st Rifle Division's 177th Rifle Regiment.

Rodin fought in the Nikopol–Krivoi Rog Offensive during January 1944. On 10 January he was seriously wounded in the groin near Dnipropetrovsk and sent to a hospital in the city. After recovering in March, he returned to command of the platoon and fought in the Odessa Offensive in April. During the capture of Odessa, Rodin reportedly killed 30 German soldiers. Between June and July Rodin was a platoon commander again in the 18th Separate Rifle Regiment of Reserve Officers. In July he became a platoon commander of the 170th Guards Rifle Regiment of the 57th Guards Rifle Division. He fought in the Lublin–Brest Offensive. On 20 July Rodin reportedly led his platoon across the Bug River west of Liuboml, captured German trenches and a bridgehead. On 1 August he led his platoon in the crossing of the Vistula near the village of Magnuszew and helped defend the Magnuszew bridgehead. His platoon reportedly suppressed the fire of five machine gun positions and killed 15 German soldiers. On 8 August he was seriously wounded in the right leg and treated in a Kharkiv hospital until May 1945.

He received the Order of Alexander Nevsky on 12 November 1944. On 24 March 1945, Rodin was awarded the title Hero of the Soviet Union and the Order of Lenin for his leadership. He was discharged in April 1945.

== Postwar ==
Between 1946 and 1962, Rodin was a worker, supply agent, head of the fire protection squad, foreman and fabric and merchandise painter at the Prikladnoye iskusstvo (Arts and crafts) Industrial Production Coopereative. During 1962 and 1963 he worked at a brush factory. Between 1963 and 1965 he was a supply agent for the Central Production Workshops. From 1965 he was an engineer and assistant chief of repair expeditions at the Ministry of Railways Transelectroproject Design and Research Institute. Rodin lived in Moscow. On 6 November 1985, he was awarded the Order of the Patriotic War 1st class on the 40th anniversary of the end of World War II. He died on 6 June 1992 and was buried in the Kalitnikovskaya Cemetery.
