= Radiation and Environmental Biophysics =

- Discipline: Radiobiology
- Language: English
- Edited by: Anna A. Friedl, Werner Rühm, Andrzej Wojcik

Publication details
- Former name: Biophysik
- History: 1974–present
- Publisher: Springer Science+Business Media
- Frequency: Quarterly
- Open access: Hybrid
- Impact factor: 1.925 (2020)

Standard abbreviations
- ISO 4: Radiat. Environ. Biophys.

Indexing
- CODEN: REBPAT
- ISSN: 0301-634X (print); 1432-2099 (web)
- OCLC no.: 01793951

Links
- Journal homepage

Radiation and Environmental Biophysics is a quarterly peer-reviewed scientific journal covering research in biophysics and radiation biology. It is published by Springer Science+Business Media and the editors-in-chief are Anna A. Friedl (LMU Munich), Werner Rühm (Helmholtz Zentrum München), and Andrzej Wojcik (Stockholm University).

It was established in 1974, by continuing in part the former title Biophysik.

== Abstracting and indexing ==
The journal is abstracted and indexed in:

- Chemical Abstracts Service;
- Index Medicus/MEDLINE/PubMed;
- Science Citation Index Expanded;
- Current Contents/Life Sciences;
- BIOSIS Previews;
- Scopus.

According to the Journal Citation Reports, the journal has a 2020 impact factor of 1.925.
