= Nuclear debate =

Nuclear debate can refer to:

- Nuclear power debate
- Nuclear weapons debate
- Uranium mining debate
- Debate over the atomic bombings of Hiroshima and Nagasaki
- Nuclear Debate (foaled 1995), a recohorse
