= Radiation Research =

- Discipline: Biology, chemistry, physics and medicine
- Language: English
- Edited by: Marc Mendonca

Publication details
- History: 1954–present
- Publisher: Radiation Research Society
- Frequency: Monthly
- Impact factor: 2.539 (2016)

Standard abbreviations
- ISO 4: Radiat. Res.

Indexing
- CODEN: RAREAE
- ISSN: 0033-7587 (print); 1938-5404 (web)
- LCCN: 54012148
- OCLC no.: 890467599

Links
- Journal homepage; Online access; Online archive

Radiation Research, the official journal of the Radiation Research Society, is a monthly peer-reviewed scientific journal covering research into the areas of biology, chemistry, medicine and physics, including epidemiology and translational research at academic institutions, private research institutes, research hospitals and government agencies. The editorial content of Radiation Research is devoted to every aspect of scientific research into radiation. The goal of the Journal is to provide researchers with the latest information in all areas of radiation science.

The current editor-in-chief is Marc Mendonca (Indiana University School of Medicine). According to the Journal Citation Reports, the journal has an impact factor of 2.539 and a 5-year impact factor of 2.775.

This journal had a supplement titled Radiation Research Supplement which appeared in 8 volumes between 1959 and 1985.

== Past Editors-in-Chief ==
Titus C. Evans, Vol. 1–50
Oddvar F. Nygaard, Vol. 51–79
Daniel Billen, Vol. 80–113
R. J. Michael Fry, Vol. 114–147
John F. Ward, Vol. 148–154
Sara Rockwell, Vol. 155–174
