= Stepan Repin =

Soviet soldier and medic

Stepan Spiridonovich Repin
- Born: 28 December 1906; Pizhanskogo, Kirov Oblast, Russian Empire
- Died: 18 October 1982 (aged 75); Kyshtym, Chelyabinsk Oblast, Soviet Union
- Burial place: Kyshtym Cemetery
- Military career
- Allegiance: Soviet Union
- Branch: Red Army
- Service years: 1942–1944
- Rank: Private
- Units: 38th Army; Voronezh Front
- Conflicts: Dnieper–Carpathian Offensive
- Awards: Hero of the Soviet Union; Order of Lenin; Order of the Red Star

Private Stepan Spiridonovich Repin (Russian: Степан Спиридонович Репин, 28 December 1906 - 18 October 1982) was a Soviet soldier and medic who was awarded the title of Hero of the Soviet Union in 1944 for valour during the Dnieper-Carpathian Offensive of the German-Soviet War.

== Early life ==
Repin was born in the village of Pizhanskogo in the then-Russian Empire in 1906 into a peasant family. He had no formal education, and was instead raised as a farm worker. He moved to Sverdlovsk in 1922 and worked as a carpenter. He joined the Communist Party of the Soviet Union in 1931, 14 years after the Russian Revolution. He was actively a part of collectivisation of Russian farms in the 1930s as a construction worker.

== German-Soviet War ==
After the outbreak of war in 1941, Repin joined the Red Army on 12 January 1942. He took a course to become a field medic and was first assigned to frontline duties in August 1943.

On 30 September 1943, while serving in the 38th Army of the Voronezh Front as it participated in the Dnieper-Carpathian Offensive in Ukraine, he crossed the Dnieper with units of the 465th Infantry Regiment near Kiev. At the beachhead he was personally responsible for retrieving many wounded soldiers while under fire from the Wehrmacht. He was seriously wounded and was retrieved himself. This wound led to his discharge from the Red Army on 22 February 1944 on health grounds.

On 10 January 1944 he was awarded the title of Hero of the Soviet Union and the Order of Lenin for "the exemplary performance of command assignments at the front against the German fascist invaders, and for displaying courage and heroism". He was also awarded the Order of the Red Star in May 1945.

== Later life ==
After his discharge, he moved to Kyshtym, in southern Russia, where he worked in a variety of factories until 1962, and survived the evacuation of the city after the Kyshtym disaster of 1957. He was then involved in volunteering work until his death in 1982.
