= Radioecology =

Ecology concerning radioactivity within ecosystems

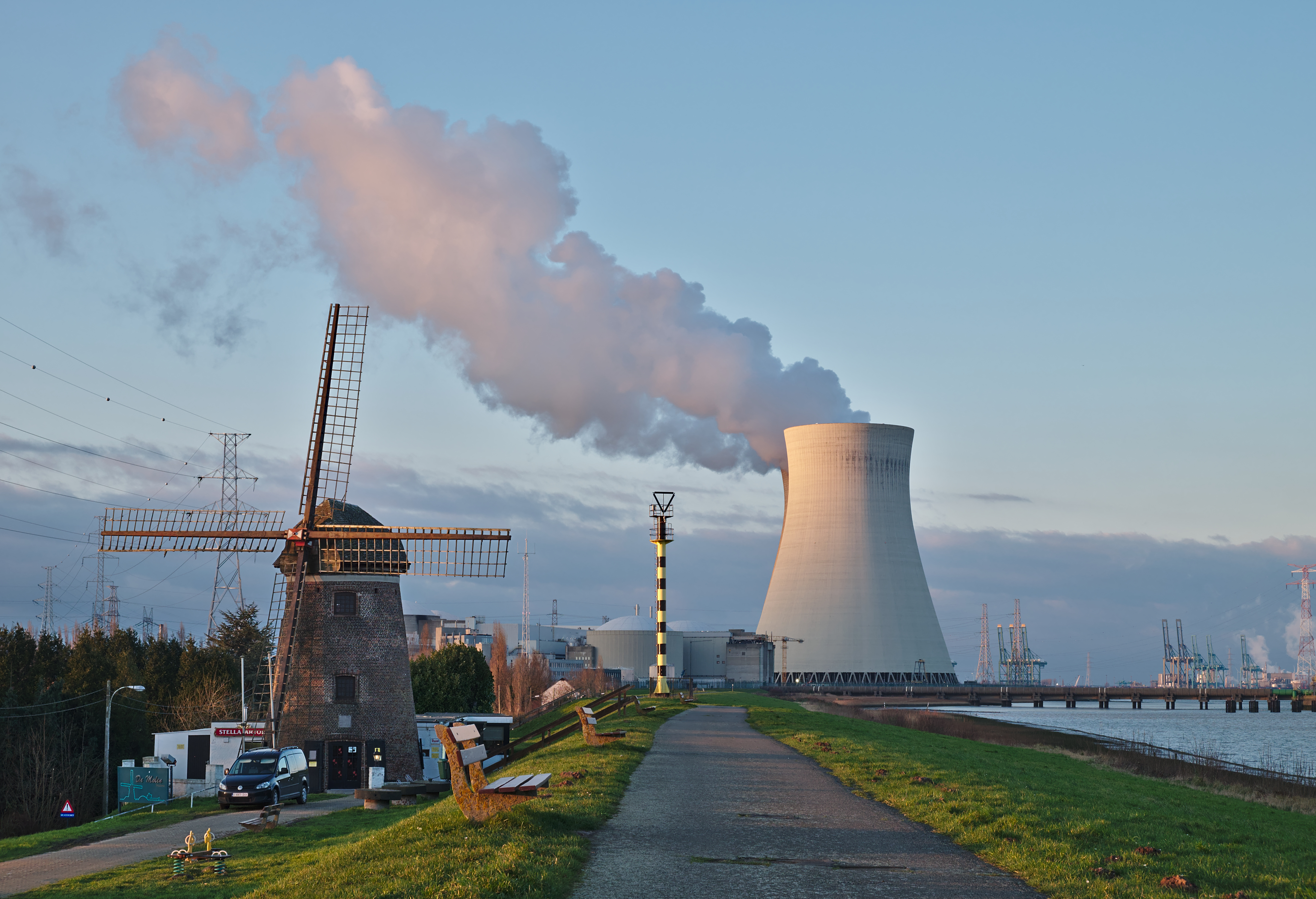
De Molen (windmill) and the nuclear power plant cooling tower in Doel, Belgium (DSCF3859).

Radioecology is the branch of ecology concerning the presence of radioactivity in Earth's ecosystems. Investigations in radioecology include field sampling, experimental field and laboratory procedures, and the development of environmentally predictive simulation models in an attempt to understand the migration methods of radioactive material throughout the environment.

The practice consists of techniques from the general sciences of physics, chemistry, mathematics, biology, and ecology, coupled with applications in radiation protection. Radioecological studies provide the necessary data for dose estimation and risk assessment regarding radioactive pollution and its effects on human and environmental health.

Radioecologists detect and evaluate the effects of ionizing radiation and radionuclides on ecosystems, and then assess their risks and dangers. Interest and studies in the area of radioecology significantly increased in order to ascertain and manage the risks involved as a result of the Chernobyl disaster. Radioecology arose in line with increasing nuclear activities, particularly following the Second World War in response to nuclear atomic weapons testing and the use of nuclear reactors to produce electricity.

== History ==
Chernobyl radiation map 1996

Artificial radioactive affliction to Earth's environment began with nuclear weapon testing during World War II, but did not become a prominent topic of public discussion until the 1980s. The Journal of Environmental Radioactivity (JER) was the first collection of literature on the subject, and its inception was not until 1984. As demand for construction of nuclear power plants increased, it became necessary for humankind to understand how radioactive material interacts with various ecosystems in order to prevent or minimize potential damage. The aftermath of Chernobyl was the first major employment of radioecological techniques to combat radioactive pollution from a nuclear power plant.

Collection of radioecological data from the Chernobyl disaster was performed on a private basis. Independent researchers collected data regarding the various dosage levels and geographical differences among the afflicted areas, allowing them to draw conclusions about the nature and intensity of the damage caused to ecosystems by the disaster.

Calculated caesium-137 concentration in the air after the Fukushima nuclear disaster, 25 March 2011

These local studies were the best available resources in containing the effects of Chernobyl, yet the researchers themselves recommended a more cohesive effort between the neighboring countries to better anticipate and control future radioecological issues, especially considering the ongoing terrorist threats of the time and the potential use of a "dirty bomb." Japan faced similar issues when the Fukushima Daiichi nuclear disaster occurred, as its government also experienced difficulty organizing collective research efforts.

An international radioecology conference was held for the first time in 2007 in Bergen, Norway. European scientists from various countries had been pushing for joint efforts to combat radioactivity in the environment for three decades, but governments were hesitant to attempt this feat because of the secrecy involved in nuclear research, as technological and military developments remained competitive.

== Objective ==
The aims of radioecology are to determine the concentrations of radionuclides in the environment, to understand their methods of introduction, and to outline their mechanisms of transfer within and between ecosystems. Radioecologists evaluate the effects of both natural and artificial radioactivity on the environment itself as well as dosimetrically on the human body. Radionuclides transfer between all of Earth's various biomes, so radioecological studies are organized within three major subdivisions of the biosphere: land environments, oceanic aquatic environments, and non-oceanic aquatic environments.

== Scientific background ==
Nuclear radiation is harmful to the environment over immediate (seconds or fractions thereof) as well as long-term (years or centuries) timescales, and it affects the environment on both microscopic (DNA) and macroscopic (population) levels. Degrees of these effects are dependent on external factors, especially in the case of humans. Radioecology encompasses all radiological interactions affecting biological and geological material as well as those between different phases of matter, as each is capable of carrying radionuclides.

Occasionally, the origin of radionuclides in the environment is actually nature itself, as some geological sites are rich in radioactive uranium or produce radon emissions. The largest source, however, is artificial pollution via nuclear meltdowns or expulsion of radioactive waste from industrial plants. The ecosystems at risk may also be fully or partially natural. An example of a fully natural ecosystem might be a meadow or old-growth forest affected by fallout from a nuclear accident such as Chernobyl or Fukushima, while a semi-natural ecosystem might be a secondary forest, farm, reservoir, or fishery that is at risk of infection from some source of radionuclides.

Basic herbaceous or bivalve species such as mosses, lichens, clams, and mussels are often the first organisms affected by fallout in an ecosystem, as they are in closest proximity to the abiotic sources of radionuclides (atmospheric, geological, or aquatic transfer). These organisms often possess the highest measurable concentrations of radionuclides, making them ideal bioindicators for sampling radioactivity in ecosystems. In the absence of sufficient data, radioecologists must often rely on analogs of a radionuclide to attempt to evaluate or hypothesize about certain ecotoxicological or metabolic effects of rarer radionuclides.

In general, techniques in radioecology focus on the study of environmental bioelectromagnetism, bioelectrochemistry, electromagnetic pollution, and isotope analysis.

== Radioecological threats ==
Earth in the 21st century is at risk of the accumulation of nuclear waste as well as the potentiality of nuclear terrorism, which could both lead to leaks.

Radioactivity originating from the Northern Hemisphere is observable dating back to the mid-20th century. Some highly toxic radionuclides have particularly long radioactive half-lives (up to as many as millions of years in some cases), meaning they will virtually never disappear on their own. The impact of these radionuclides on biological material (correlated with their radioactivity and toxicity) is similar to that of other environmental toxins, making them difficult to trace within plants and animals.

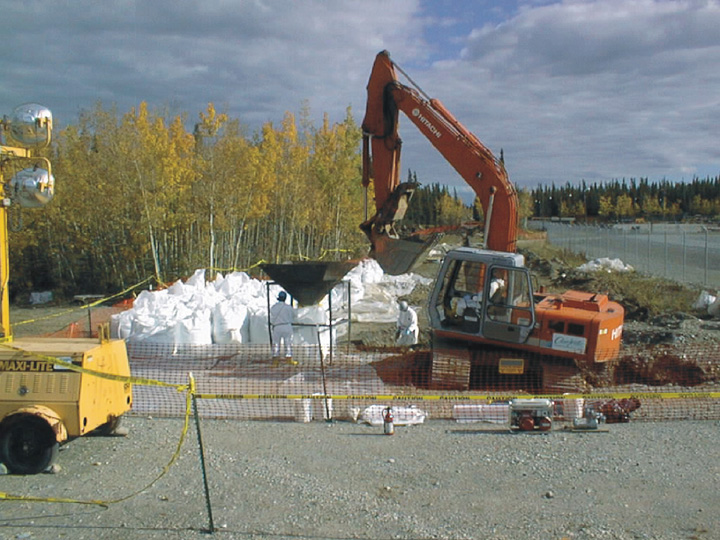
Removal of 1500 cubic yards of soil contaminated with extremely low levels of nuclear waste at the Fort Greely Nuclear Power Plant in Alaska.

Some aging nuclear facilities were not originally intended to operate as long as they have, and the consequences of their waste procedures were not well understood when they were built. One example of this is how the radionuclide tritium is sometimes released into the surrounding environment as a result of nuclear reprocessing, as this was not a foreseen complication in the original waste management orders of operations. It is difficult to diverge from these procedures once a reactor has already been put to use, since any change either risks releasing even more radioactive material or jeopardizes the safety of the individuals working on the disposal. Protection of human well-being has been, and remains to this day, paramount in the aims of radioecological research and risk assessment.

Radioecology often calls into question the ethics of protecting human health versus the preservation of the environment in the interest of fighting extinction of other species, but public opinion on this matter is shifting.

== See also ==
- Bellesrad
- Bioelectromagnetics
- Environmental radioactivity
- Health Physics
- Radiation
- Radiobiology
