= Environmental radioactivity =

Radioactivity naturally present within the Earth

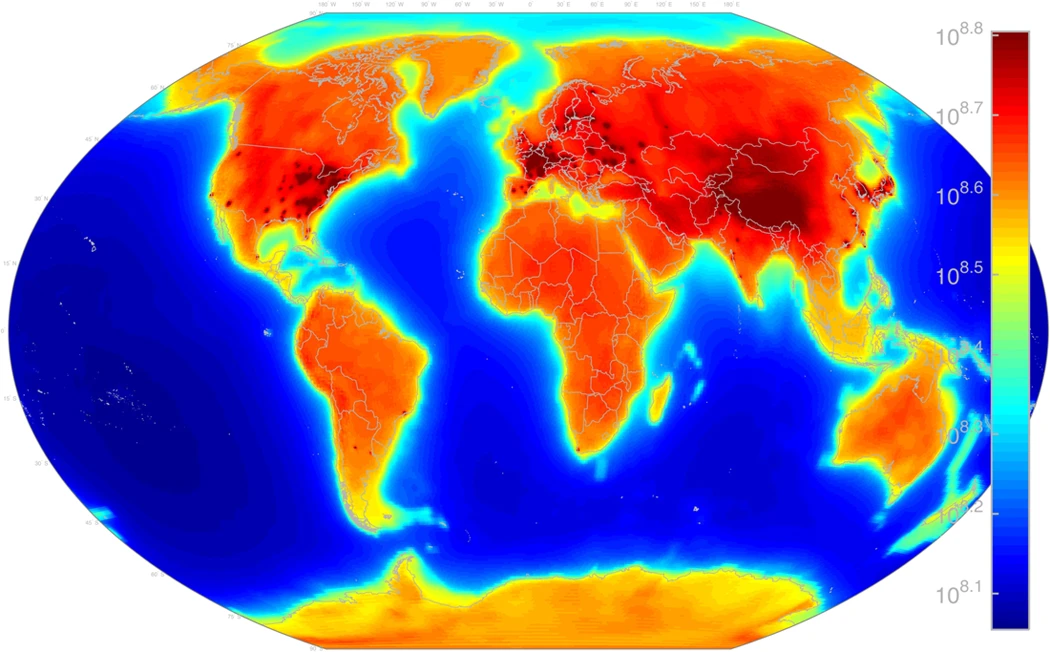
AGM2015: A worldwide v̄_{e} flux map combining geoneutrinos from natural Uranium-238 and Thorium-232 decay in the Earth's crust and mantle as well as manmade reactor-v̄_{e} emitted by power reactors worldwide.

Environmental radioactivity is part of the overall background radiation and is produced by radioactive materials in the human environment. While some radioisotopes, such as strontium-90 (^{90}Sr) and technetium-99 (^{99}Tc), are only found on Earth as a result of human activity, and some, like potassium-40 (^{40}K), are only present due to natural processes, a few isotopes, such as tritium (^{3}H), result from both natural processes and human activities. The concentration and location of some natural isotopes, particularly uranium-238 (^{238}U), can be affected by human activity, such as nuclear weapons testing.

== Background level in soils ==
Radioactivity is present everywhere, and has been since the formation of the Earth. Natural radioactivity detected in soil is predominantly due to the following four natural radioisotopes: ^{40}K, ^{226}Ra, ^{238}U, and ^{232}Th. In one kilogram of soil, the potassium-40 amounts to an average 370 Bq of radiation, with a typical range of 100–700 Bq; the others each contribute some 25 Bq, with typical ranges of 10–50 Bq (7–50 Bq for the ^{232}Th). Some soils may vary greatly from these norms.

=== Sea and river silt ===
A recent report on the Sava river in Serbia suggests that many of the river silts contain about 100 Bq kg^{−1} of natural radioisotopes (^{226}Ra, ^{232}Th, and ^{238}U). According to the United Nations the normal concentration of uranium in soil ranges between 300 μg kg^{−1} and 11.7 mg kg^{−1}. It is well known that some plants, called hyperaccumulators, are able to absorb and concentrate metals within their tissues; iodine was first isolated from seaweed in France, which suggests that seaweed is an iodine hyperaccumulator.

Synthetic radioisotopes also can be detected in silt. Busby quotes a report on the plutonium activity in Welsh intertidal sediments by Garland et al. (1989), which suggests that the closer a site is to Sellafield, the higher is the concentration of plutonium in the silt. Some relationship between distance and activity can be seen in their data, when fitted to an exponential curve, but the scatter of the points is large (R^{2} = 0.3683).

== Man-made ==
Atmospheric ^{14}C Bomb pulse, New Zealand and Austria. The New Zealand curve is representative for the Southern Hemisphere, the Austrian curve is representative for the Northern Hemisphere. Atmospheric nuclear weapon tests almost doubled the concentration of ^{14}C in the Northern Hemisphere.

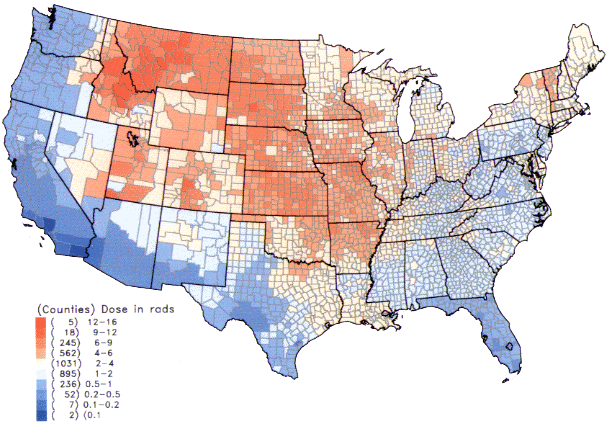
Per capita thyroid doses in the continental United States resulting from all exposure routes from all atmospheric nuclear tests conducted at the Nevada Test Site from 1951 to 1962.

The additional radioactivity in the biosphere caused by human activity due to the releases of man-made radioactivity and of Naturally Occurring Radioactive Materials (NORM) can be divided into several classes.

1. Normal licensed releases which occur during the regular operation of a plant or process handling man-made radioactive materials.
  - For instance the release of ^{99}Tc from a nuclear medicine department of a hospital which occurs when a person given a Tc imaging agent expels the agent.
2. Releases of man-made radioactive materials which occur during an industrial or research accident.
  - For instance the Chernobyl accident.
3. Releases which occur as a result of military activity.
  - For example, a nuclear weapons test, which have caused a global fallout, peaking in 1963 (the Bomb pulse), and up to 2.4 million deaths by 2020.
4. Releases which occur as a result of a crime.
  - For example, the Goiânia accident where thieves, unaware of its radioactive content, stole some medical equipment and as a result a number of people were exposed to radiation.
5. Releases of naturally occurring radioactive materials (NORM) as a result of mining etc.
  - For example, the release of the trace quantities of uranium and thorium in coal, when it is burned in power stations.

=== Farming and the transfer to humans of deposited radioactivity ===
Just because a radioisotope lands on the surface of the soil, does not mean it will enter the human food chain. After release into the environment, radioactive materials can reach humans in a range of different routes, and the chemistry of the element usually dictates the most likely route.

Airborne radioactive material can have an effect on humans via a range of routes.

==== Cows ====
Jiří Hála claims in his textbook "Radioactivity, Ionizing Radiation and Nuclear Energy" that cattle only pass a minority of the strontium, caesium, plutonium and americium they ingest to the humans who consume milk and meat. Using milk as an example, if the cow has a daily intake of 1000 Bq of the preceding isotopes then the milk will have the following activities.

- ^{90}Sr, 2 Bq/L
- ^{137}Cs, 5 Bq/L
- ^{239}Pu, 0.001 Bq/L
- ^{241}Am, 0.001 Bq/L

==== Soil ====
Jiří Hála's textbook states that soils vary greatly in their ability to bind radioisotopes, the clay particles and humic acids can alter the distribution of the isotopes between the soil water and the soil. The distribution coefficient K_{d} is the ratio of the soil's radioactivity (Bq g^{−1}) to that of the soil water (Bq ml^{−1}). If the radioactivity is tightly bonded to by the minerals in the soil then less radioactivity can be absorbed by crops and grass growing in the soil.

- Cs-137 K_{d} = 1000
- Pu-239 K_{d} = 10000 to 100000
- Sr-90 K_{d} = 80 to 150
- I-131 K_{d} = 0.007 to 50

=== The Trinity test ===
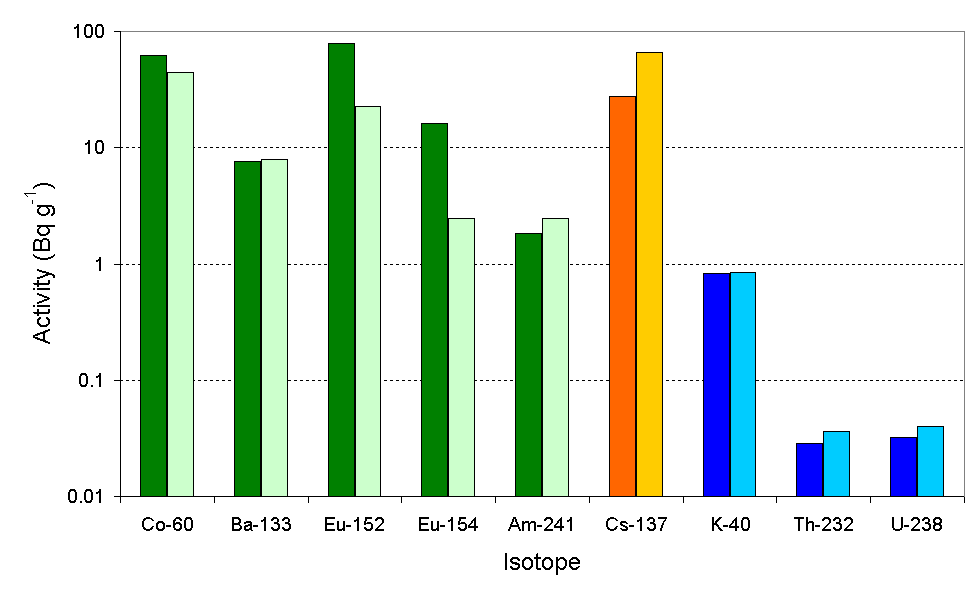
Levels of radioactivity in the Trinity glass from two different samples as measured by gamma spectroscopy on lumps of the glass

One dramatic source of man-made radioactivity is a nuclear weapons test. The glassy trinitite created by the first atom bomb contains radioisotopes formed by neutron activation and nuclear fission. In addition some natural radioisotopes are present. A recent paper reports the levels of long-lived radioisotopes in the trinitite. The trinitite was formed from feldspar and quartz which were melted by the heat. Two samples of trinitite were used, the first (left-hand-side bars in the graph) was taken from between 40 and 65 meters of ground zero while the other sample was taken from further away from the ground zero point.

The ^{152}Eu (half life 13.54 year) and ^{154}Eu (half life 8.59 year) were mainly formed by the neutron activation of the europium in the soil, it is clear that the level of radioactivity for these isotopes is highest where the neutron dose to the soil was larger. Some of the ^{60}Co (half life 5.27 year) is generated by activation of the cobalt in the soil, but some was also generated by the activation of the cobalt in the steel (100 foot) tower. This ^{60}Co from the tower would have been scattered over the site reducing the difference in the soil levels.

The ^{133}Ba (half life 10.5 year) and ^{241}Am (half life 432.6 year) are due to the neutron activation of barium and plutonium inside the bomb. The barium was present in the form of the nitrate in the chemical explosives used while the plutonium was the fissile fuel used.

The ^{137}Cs level is higher in the sample that was further away from the ground zero point – this is thought to be because the precursors to the ^{137}Cs (^{137}I and ^{137}Xe) and, to a lesser degree, the caesium itself are volatile. The natural radioisotopes in the glass are about the same in both locations.

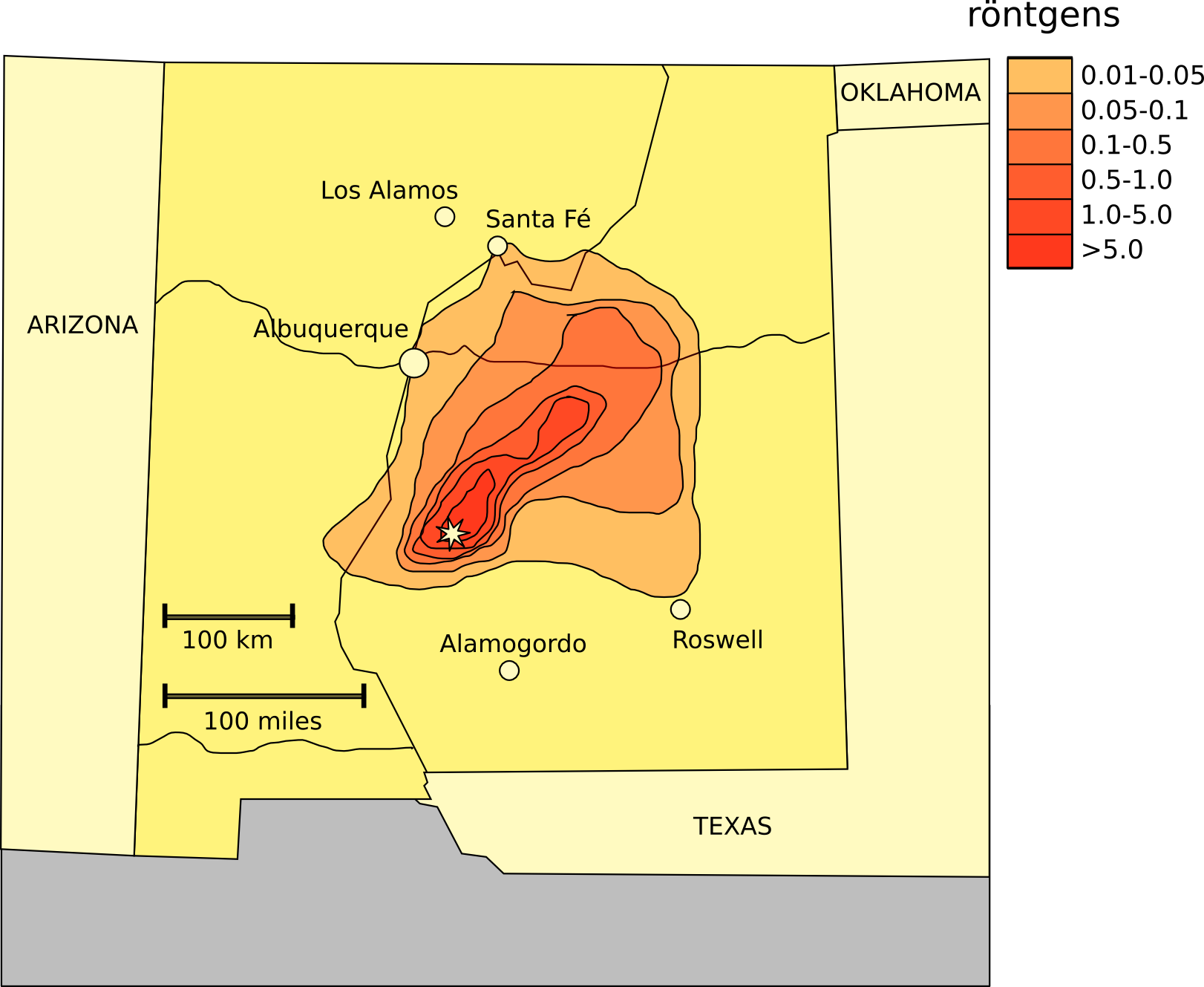
Fallout around the Trinity site. The radioactive cloud moved towards northeast with high röntgen levels within about 100 miles (160 km).

=== Activation products ===
The action of neutrons on stable isotopes can form radioisotopes, for instance the neutron bombardment (neutron activation) of nitrogen-14 forms carbon-14. This radioisotope can be released from the nuclear fuel cycle; this is the radioisotope responsible for the majority of the dose experienced by the population as a result of the activities of the nuclear power industry.

Nuclear bomb tests have increased the specific activity of carbon, whereas the use of fossil fuels has decreased it. See the article on radiocarbon dating for further details.

=== Fission products ===
Discharges from nuclear plants within the nuclear fuel cycle introduce fission products to the environment. The releases from nuclear reprocessing plants tend to be medium to long-lived radioisotopes; this is because the nuclear fuel is allowed to cool for several years before being dissolved in the nitric acid. The releases from nuclear reactor accidents and bomb detonations will contain a greater amount of the short-lived radioisotopes (when the amounts are expressed in activity Bq)).

==== Short lived ====
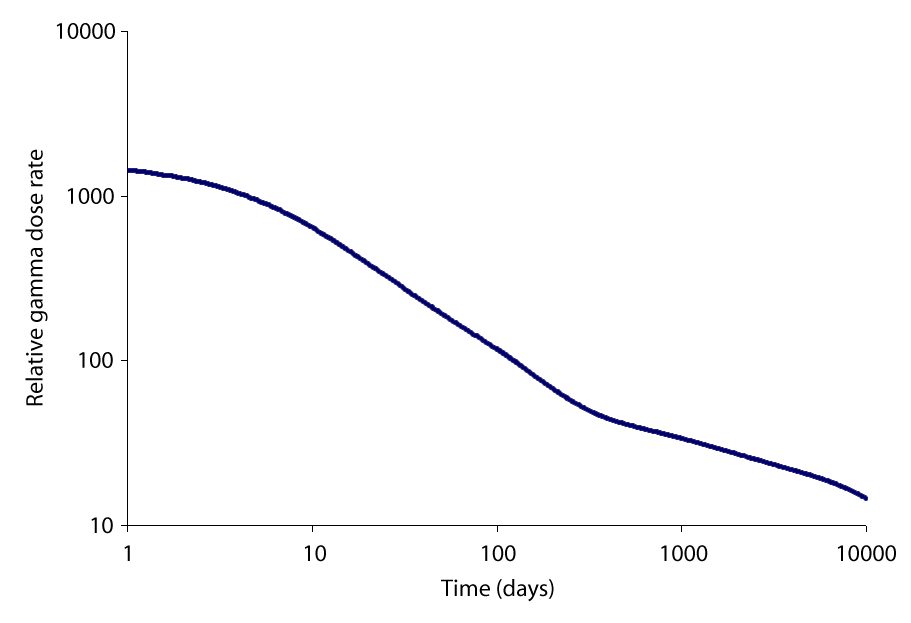
Logarithmic scaled graph of the external gamma dose for a person in the open near the Chernobyl site.

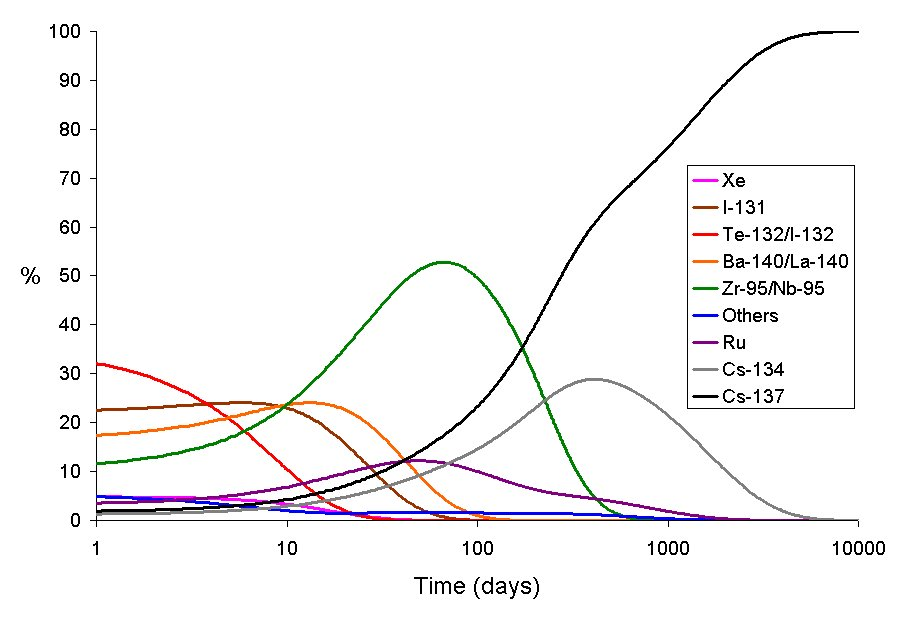
The contributions made by the different isotopes to the dose (in air) caused in the contaminated area in the time shortly after the accident. This image was drawn using data from the OECD report, the Korean table of the isotopes and the second edition of 'The radiochemical manual'.

An example of a short-lived fission product is iodine-131, this can also be formed as an activation product by the neutron activation of tellurium.

In both bomb fallout and a release from a power reactor accident, the short-lived isotopes cause the dose rate on day one to be much higher than that which will be experienced at the same site many days later. This holds true even if no attempts at decontamination are made. In the graphs below, the total gamma dose rate and the share of the dose due to each main isotope released by the Chernobyl accident are shown.

==== Medium lived ====
An example of a medium lived is ^{137}Cs, which has a half-life of 30 years. Caesium is released in bomb fallout and from the nuclear fuel cycle. A paper has been written on the radioactivity in oysters found in the Irish Sea, these were found by gamma spectroscopy to contain ^{141}Ce, ^{144}Ce, ^{103}Ru, ^{106}Ru, ^{137}Cs, ^{95}Zr and ^{95}Nb. In addition, a zinc activation product (^{65}Zn) was found, this is thought to be due to the corrosion of magnox fuel cladding in cooling ponds. The concentration of all these isotopes in the Irish Sea attributable to nuclear facilities such as Sellafield has significantly decreased in recent decades.

An important part of the Chernobyl release was the caesium-137, this isotope is responsible for much of the long term (at least one year after the fire) external exposure which has occurred at the site. The caesium isotopes in the fallout have had an effect on farming.

A large amount of caesium was released during the Goiânia accident where a radioactive source (made for medical use) was stolen and then smashed open during an attempt to convert it into scrap metal. The accident could have been stopped at several stages; first, the last legal owners of the source failed to make arrangements for the source to be stored in a safe and secure place; and second, the scrap metal workers who took it did not recognise the markings which indicated that it was a radioactive object.

Soudek et al. reported in 2006 details of the uptake of ^{90}Sr and ^{137}Cs into sunflowers grown under hydroponic conditions. The caesium was found in the leaf veins, in the stem and in the apical leaves. It was found that 12% of the caesium entered the plant, and 20% of the strontium. This paper also reports details of the effect of potassium, ammonium and calcium ions on the uptake of the radioisotopes.

Caesium binds tightly to clay minerals such as illite and montmorillonite; hence it remains in the upper layers of soil where it can be accessed by plants with shallow roots (such as grass). Hence grass and mushrooms can carry a considerable amount of ^{137}Cs which can be transferred to humans through the food chain. One of the best countermeasures in dairy farming against ^{137}Cs is to mix up the soil by deeply ploughing the soil. This has the effect of putting the ^{137}Cs out of reach of the shallow roots of the grass, hence the level of radioactivity in the grass will be lowered. Also, after a nuclear war or serious accident, the removal of top few cm of soil and its burial in a shallow trench will reduce the long term gamma dose to humans due to ^{137}Cs as the gamma photons will be attenuated by their passage through the soil. The more remote the trench is from humans and the deeper the trench is the better the degree of protection which will be afforded to the human population.

In livestock farming, an important countermeasure against ^{137}Cs is to feed to animals a little prussian blue. This iron potassium cyanide compound acts as an ion-exchanger. The cyanide is so tightly bonded to the iron that it is safe for a human to eat several grams of prussian blue per day. The prussian blue reduces the biological half-life (not to be confused with the nuclear half-life) of the caesium). The physical or nuclear half-life of ^{137}Cs is about 30 years, which is a constant and can not be changed; however, the biological half-life will change according to the nature and habits of the organism for which it is expressed. Caesium in humans normally has a biological half-life of between one and four months. An added advantage of the prussian blue is that the caesium which is stripped from the animal in the droppings is in a form which is not available to plants. Hence, it prevents the caesium from being recycled. The form of prussian blue required for the treatment of humans or animals is a special grade. Attempts to use the pigment grade used in paints have not been successful.

==== Long lived ====
Examples of long-lived isotopes include iodine-129 and Tc-99, which have nuclear half-lives of 15 million and 200,000 years, respectively.

=== Plutonium and the other actinides ===
In popular culture, plutonium is credited with being the ultimate threat to life and limb which is wrong; while ingesting plutonium is not likely to be good for one's health, other radioisotopes such as radium are more toxic to humans. Regardless, the introduction of the transuranium elements such as plutonium into the environment should be avoided wherever possible. Currently, the activities of the nuclear reprocessing industry have been subject to great debate as one of the fears of those opposed to the industry is that large amounts of plutonium will be either mismanaged or released into the environment.

In the past, one of the largest releases of plutonium into the environment has been nuclear bomb testing.

- Those tests in the air scattered some plutonium over the entire globe; this great dilution of the plutonium has resulted in the threat to each exposed person being very small as each person is only exposed to a very small amount.
- The underground tests tend to form molten rock, which rapidly cools and seals the actinides into the rock, so rendering them unable to move; again the threat to humans is small unless the site of the test is dug up.
- The safety trials where bombs were subject to simulated accidents pose the greatest threat to people; some areas of land used for such experiments (conducted in the open air) have not been fully released for general use despite in one case an extensive decontamination.

== Natural ==
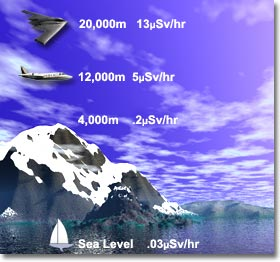
Radiation levels by altitude] on Earth.

=== Activation products from cosmic rays ===
Cosmogenic isotopes (or cosmogenic nuclides) are rare isotopes created when a high-energy cosmic ray interacts with the nucleus of an in situ atom. These isotopes are produced within earth materials such as rocks or soil, in Earth's atmosphere, and in extraterrestrial items such as meteorites. By measuring cosmogenic isotopes, scientists are able to gain insight into a range of geological and astronomical processes. There are both radioactive and stable cosmogenic isotopes. Some of these radioisotopes are tritium, carbon-14 and phosphorus-32.

==== Production modes ====
Here is a list of radioisotopes formed by the action of cosmic rays on the atmosphere; the list also contains the production mode of the isotope. These data were obtained from the SCOPE50 report, see table 1.9 of chapter 1.

Isotopes formed by the action of cosmic rays on the air
Isotope	Mode of formation
³H (tritium)	^{14}N (n, ^{12}C)³H
^{7}Be	Spallation (N and O)
^{10}Be	Spallation (N and O)
^{11}C	Spallation (N and O)
^{14}C	^{14}N (n, p) ^{14}C
^{18}F	^{18}O (p, n)^{18}F and Spallation (Ar)
^{22}Na	Spallation (Ar)
^{24}Na	Spallation (Ar)
^{28}Mg	Spallation (Ar)
^{31}Si	Spallation (Ar)
^{32}Si	Spallation (Ar)
^{32}P	Spallation (Ar)
^{34m}Cl	Spallation (Ar)
^{35}S	Spallation (Ar)
^{36}Cl	^{35}Cl (n, )^{36}Cl
^{37}Ar	^{37}Cl (p, n)^{37}Ar
^{38}Cl	Spallation (Ar)
^{39}Ar	^{38}Ar (n, )^{39}Ar
^{39}Cl	^{40}Ar (n, np)^{39}Cl & spallation (Ar)
^{41}Ar	^{40}Ar (n, )^{41}Ar
^{81}Kr	^{80}Kr (n, ) ^{81}Kr

==== Transfer to ground ====
The level of beryllium-7 in the air is related to the Sun spot cycle, as radiation from the Sun forms this radioisotope in the atmosphere. The rate at which it is transferred from the air to the ground is controlled in part by the weather.

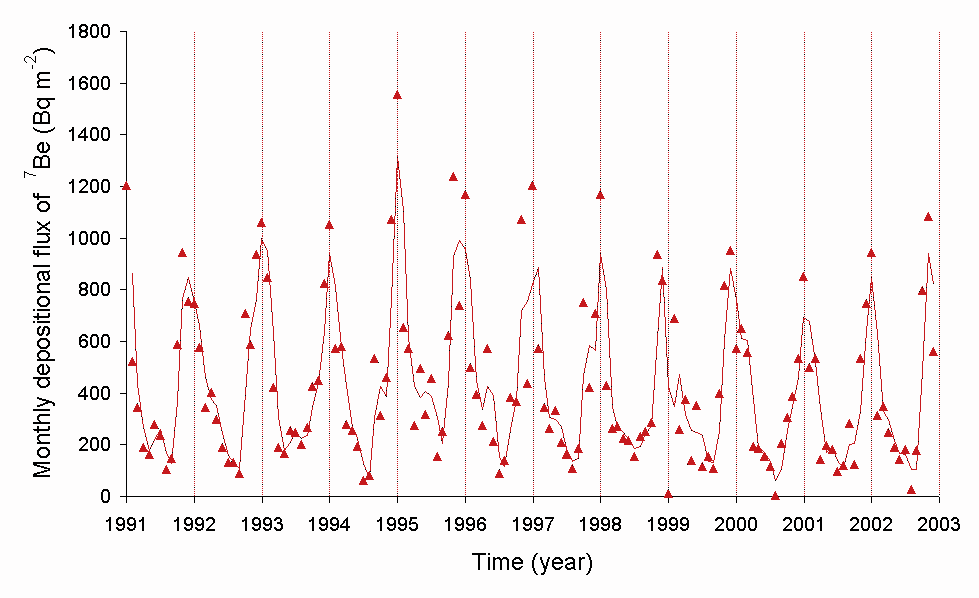
The rate of delivery of Be-7 from the air to the ground in Japan (source M. Yamamoto et al., Journal of Environmental Radioactivity, 2006, 86, 110–131)

==== Applications in geology listed by isotope ====
Commonly measured long lived cosmogenic isotopes
element	mass	half-life (years)	typical application
helium	3	stable -	exposure dating of olivine-bearing rocks
beryllium	10	1.36 million	exposure dating of quartz-bearing rocks, sediment, dating of ice cores, measurement of erosion rates
carbon	14	5,730	dating of organic matter, water
neon	21	stable -	dating of very stable, long-exposed surfaces, including meteorites
aluminum	26	720,000	exposure dating of rocks, sediment
chlorine	36	308,000	exposure dating of rocks, groundwater tracer
calcium	41	103,000	exposure dating of carbonate rocks
iodine	129	15.7 million	groundwater tracer

==== Applications of dating ====
Because cosmogenic isotopes have long half-lives (anywhere from thousands to millions of years), scientists find them useful for geologic dating. Cosmogenic isotopes are produced at or near the surface of the Earth, and thus are commonly applied to problems of measuring ages and rates of geomorphic and sedimentary events and processes.

Specific applications of cosmogenic isotopes include:

- exposure dating of earth surfaces, including glacially scoured bedrock, fault scarps, landslide debris
- burial dating of sediment, bedrock, ice
- measurement of steady-state erosion rates
- absolute dating of organic matter (radiocarbon dating)
- absolute dating of water masses, measurement of groundwater transport rates
- absolute dating of meteorites, lunar surfaces

==== Methods of measurement for the long-lived isotopes ====
To measure cosmogenic isotopes produced within solid earth materials, such as rock, samples are generally first put through a process of mechanical separation. The sample is crushed and desirable material, such as a particular mineral (quartz in the case of Be-10), is separated from non-desirable material by using a density separation in a heavy liquid medium such as lithium sodium tungstate (LST). The sample is then dissolved, a common isotope carrier added (Be-9 carrier in the case of Be-10), and the aqueous solution is purified down to an oxide or other pure solid.

Finally, the ratio of the rare cosmogenic isotope to the common isotope is measured using accelerator mass spectrometry. The original concentration of cosmogenic isotope in the sample is then calculated using the measured isotopic ratio, the mass of the sample, and the mass of carrier added to the sample.

=== Radium and radon from the decay of long-lived actinides ===
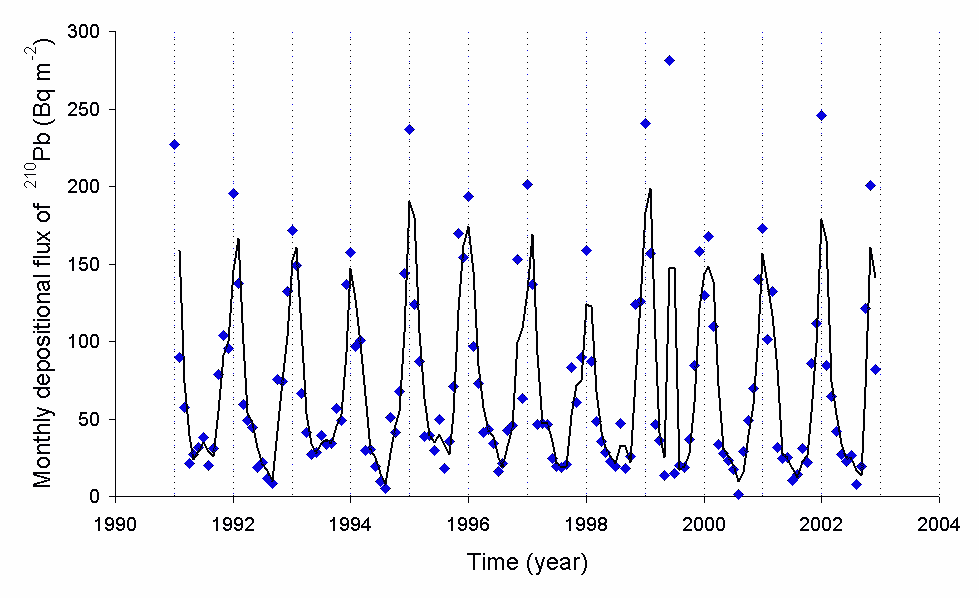
Lead-210 deposition rate as a function of time as observed in Japan

Radium and radon are in the environment because they are decay products of uranium and thorium.

The radon (^{222}Rn) released into the air decays to ^{210}Pb and other radioisotopes, and the levels of ^{210}Pb can be measured. The rate of deposition of this radioisotope is dependent on the weather. Below is a graph of the deposition rate observed in Japan.

=== Uranium–lead dating ===
Uranium–lead dating is usually performed on the mineral zircon (ZrSiO_{4}), though other materials can be used. Zircon incorporates uranium atoms into its crystalline structure as substitutes for zirconium, but strongly rejects lead. It has a high blocking temperature, is resistant to mechanical weathering and is chemically inert. Zircon also forms multiple crystal layers during metamorphic events, which each may record an isotopic age of the event. These can be dated by a SHRIMP ion microprobe.

One of the advantages of this method is that any sample provides two clocks, one based on uranium-235's decay to lead-207 with a half-life of about 703 million years, and one based on uranium-238's decay to lead-206 with a half-life of about 4.5 billion years, providing a built-in crosscheck that allows accurate determination of the age of the sample even if some of the lead has been lost.

== See also ==
- Journal of Environmental Radioactivity
- Naturally occurring radioactive material
- Radioecology
- Radium in the environment
- Uranium in the environment
