= Journal of Environmental Radioactivity =

- Discipline: Radioecology
- Language: English
- Edited by: Stephen C. Sheppard

Publication details
- History: 1984–present
- Publisher: Elsevier
- Frequency: Monthly (Note: At the end of 2011 (volume 102), the journal switched from having twelve monthly issues per volume to having each monthly issue constitute a single volume.)
- Open access: Hybrid
- Impact factor: 2.674 (2020)

Standard abbreviations
- ISO 4: J. Environ. Radioact.

Indexing
- CODEN: JERAEE
- ISSN: 0265-931X
- LCCN: sn85011782
- OCLC no.: 38993733

Links
- Journal homepage; Online access

Journal of Environmental Radioactivity is a monthly peer-reviewed scientific journal on environmental radioactivity and radioecology. It was proposed and started by Founding Editor Murdoch Baxter in 1984 and is published by Elsevier. Its current editor-in-chief is Stephen C. Sheppard (ECOMatters Inc.) and is an affiliated journal of the International Union of Radioecology.

== Abstracting and indexing ==
The journal is abstracted and indexed in:

- Chemical Abstracts Service
- Index Medicus/MEDLINE/PubMed
- Science Citation Index Expanded
- Current Contents/Agriculture, Biology & Environmental Sciences
- The Zoological Record
- BIOSIS Previews
- Scopus

According to the Journal Citation Reports, the journal has a 2020 impact factor of 2.674.
