= Computed tomography dose index =

The computed tomography dose index (CTDI) is a commonly used radiation exposure index in X-ray computed tomography (CT), first defined in 1981. The unit of CTDI is the gray (Gy) and it can be used in conjunction with patient size to estimate the absorbed dose. The CTDI and absorbed dose may differ by more than a factor of two for small patients such as children.

== Definitions ==
Because CT scanners typically acquire multiple slices during a single rotation with a single beam, the CTDI is calculated by integrating over the dose profile for a single axial rotation, then dividing by the nominal beam width:

$CTDI=\frac{1}{nT}\int_{-z}^{+z}{D(z)\text{d}z}$

where $n$ is the number of slices acquired per single axial rotation, $T$ is the width of a single acquired slice (and thus $n$$T$ is the nominal beam width) and $D(z)$ is the radiation dose measured at position $z$ along the scanner's main axis - the dose profile.

This measurement is most often made using a 100-mm standard pencil dose chamber as this is representative of a typical scan length:

$CTDI_{100}=\frac{1}{nT}\int_{-50 mm}^{50 mm}{D(z)\text{d}z}$.

The absorbed dose to water $D_{w}(z)$ (used to refer back to patient dose) is typically measured in a cylindrical head (16 cm diameter) or body (32 cm diameter) phantom of length approximately 14–15 cm.

The dose distribution imparted by a CT scan is much more homogeneous than that imparted by radiography, but is still somewhat larger near the skin than in the centre of the body. The weighted CTDI was introduced to account for this:

$CTDI_w=\frac{1}{3} CTDI_{100}^{central} + \frac{2}{3} CTDI_{100}^{peripheral}$

using measurements acquired at central and peripheral positions in the head or body phantoms described above.

=== CTDI in helical CT ===
In helical CT, the pitch of the machine - a factor of the speed at which the couch travels through the gantry and the tube rotation frequency - also impacts on patient dose. The pitch factor, P, is defined as

$P=\frac{d_{360^{\circ}}}{C}$

where $d_{360^{\circ}}$ is the distance travelled by the couch during one full gantry rotation and $C$ is the beam collimation (single-slice CT) or the total thickness of all simultaneously acquired slices (multislice CT). The following quantity is therefore used to take account of pitch:

$CTDI_{vol}=\frac{CTDI_{w}}{P}$

Similar measures with yet wider chambers are useful for CT systems with large numbers of detector rows.

CTDI can also be measured with polymer gel dosimetry.

=== Relation to DLP ===
The dose-length product (DLP) is a quantity defined for use in CT as

$DLP = CTDI_{vol}.nT$

for $n$ and $T$ as described above ($nT$ is therefore the total scan length). This quantity is analogous to the dose-area product (DAP) used in planar radiography.
