= Radiation Exposure Monitoring =

Radiation Exposure Monitoring (REM) is a framework developed by Integrating the Healthcare Enterprise (IHE), for utilizing existing technical standards, such as DICOM, to provide information about the dose delivered to patients in radiology procedures, in an interoperable format.

Ready access to dose information aids medical staff, including radiographers, radiologists and medical physicists, in the radiation protection goal of reducing doses to a level "as low as reasonably practicable".

== Collecting and using dose data ==
A challenge in automating the reporting of radiation exposure estimations has traditionally been a function of whether the record of dose provided by a manufacturer is persistent (i.e. stored electronically) or transient (i.e. displayed on a read-out). Many current radiology devices provide only transient records, either in the form of human-readable dose screens that require manual intervention (i.e. pencil and paper) to permanently capture the patient exposure, or else in the equally perishable data generated by a modality-performed procedure step (MPPS) created to help manage the scheduling system.

MPPS is insufficient, having a limited ability to encode complex data, and no options for long-term storage or queries. Newer scanners are able to create DICOM radiation dose structured reports (RDSRs) alongside the images themselves. REM addresses perishable dose data by creating a persistent record that can be sent to a central repository, and then queried and analyzed by health information systems for either a specific patient's history or for analysis of radiation exposure levels among patient groups, platforms, or clinical operations. RDSRs, and the use of the IHE REM framework are part of the IEC 61910 standard.

== Standards and Integrating the Healthcare Enterprise (IHE) ==
Integrating the Healthcare Enterprise (IHE) is an initiative by healthcare professionals and industry to improve the way computer systems in healthcare share information. IHE "Integration Profiles" are designed make systems easier to implement and integrate, and help care providers use information more effectively. IHE Integration Profiles describe clinical information management use cases and specify how to use existing standards (HL7, DICOM, etc.) to address them. Systems that implement integration profiles solve interoperability problems. For equipment vendors, Integration Profiles are implementation guides. For healthcare providers, Integration Profiles are shorthand for integration requirements in purchasing documents. Integration Statements tell customers the IHE Profiles supported by a specific release of a specific product.

The REM Profile enables imaging modalities to export radiation exposure estimation details in a standard format. Radiation reporting systems can either query for these "dose objects" periodically from an archive, or receive them directly from the modalities. The radiation reporting system is expected to perform relevant dose QA analysis and produce related reports. The analysis methods and report format are not considered topics for standardization and are not covered in the profile. The profile also describes how radiation reporting systems can submit dose estimation reports to centralized registries such as might be run by professional societies or national accreditation groups. In the United States, the American College of Radiology DIR is one such registry. By profiling automated methods, the profile allows dose information to be collected and evaluated without imposing a significant administrative burden on staff otherwise occupied with caring for patients.

In addition to supporting profile quality assurance (QA) of the technical process at the local facility, (e.g. determining if the dose was appropriate for the procedure performed), the profile also supports population analysis performed by national registries. Compliant software products are capable of de-identifying and submitting dose reports to a national dose register securely, making it relatively simple for groups such as ACR to collect and process dose data from across the country once they have recruited participating sites.

== Challenges ==
=== Fluoroscopy monitoring ===
Most fluoroscopic x-ray equipment can provide an estimate of the cumulative dose that would have resulted to a point on the skin if the x-ray beam was stationary during the complete procedure. Such an estimate is derived from the fluoroscopic technique factors and the total exposure time, including any image recording, or from built-in dosimetry systems. However, these systems, known as dose area product meters (DAP meters), do not directly provide skin dose information without further knowledge of the sizes of the x-ray beam during the entire procedure. The relationship between cumulative skin dose and peak skin dose is highly variable, as has been demonstrated in a number of publications.

=== Limitations of dose monitoring ===
According to IHE, "It is important to understand the technical and practical limitations of dose monitoring and the reasons why the monitored values may not accurately provide the radiation dose administered to the patient":

1. The values provided by this tool are not "measurements" but only calculated estimates.
2. For computed tomography, "CTDI" is a dose estimate to a standard plastic phantom. Plastic is not human tissue. Therefore, the dose should not be represented as the dose received by the patient.
3. For planar or projection imaging, the recorded values may be exposure, skin dose or some other value that may not be patient's body or organ dose.
4. It is inappropriate and inaccurate to add up dose estimates received by different parts of the body into a single cumulative value.

Despite such limitations, interest in monitoring radiation dose estimates is clearly expressed in such documents as the European directive Euratom 97/43 and the American College of Radiology Dose Whitepaper.
