= Dosimetry =

Measurement of absorbed ionizing radiation

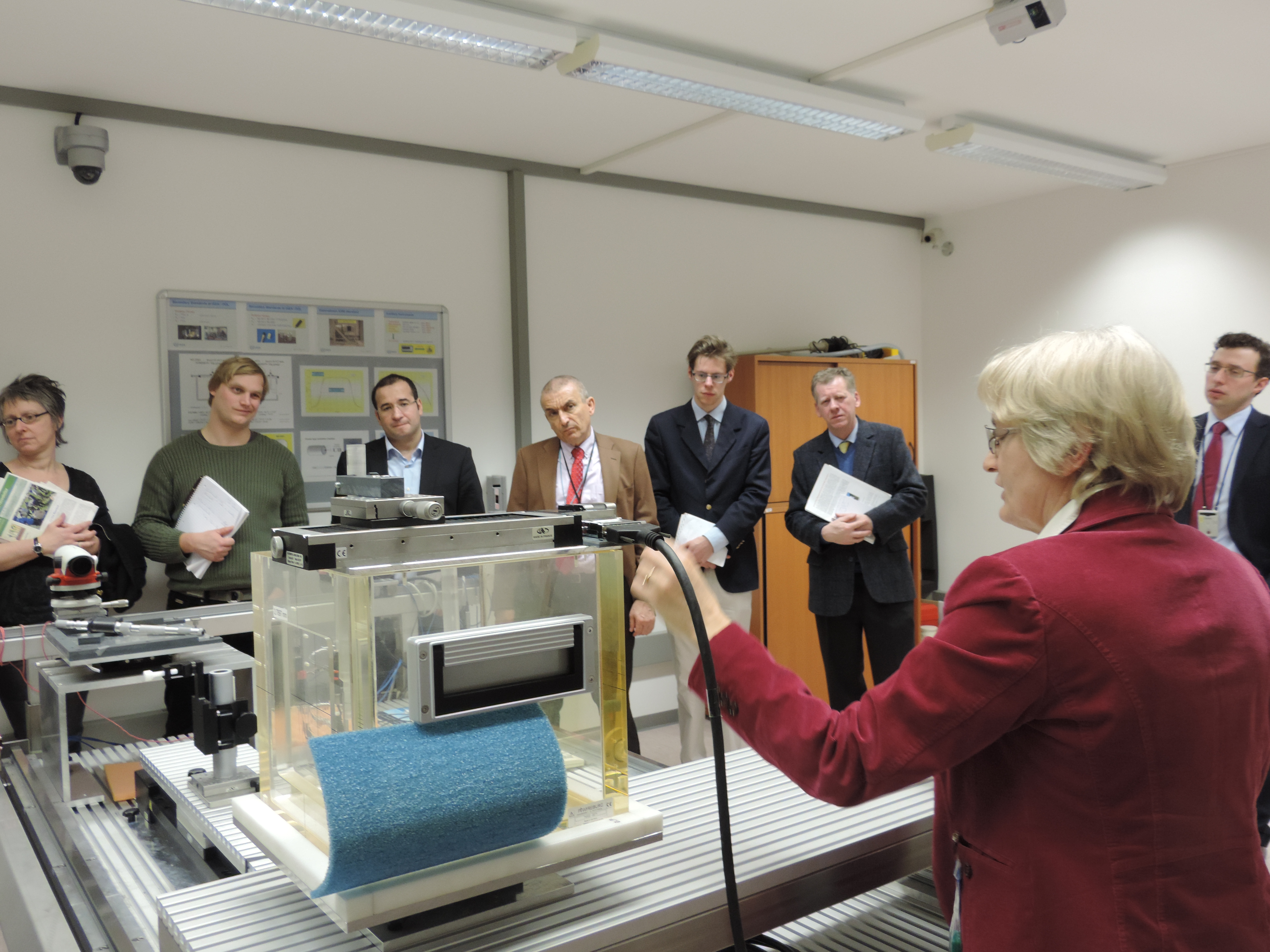
Joanna Izewska gives Ambassador Frank Recker and his delegation a tour of the IAEA Dosimetry Laboratory.

Radiation dosimetry in the fields of health physics and radiation protection is the measurement, calculation and assessment of the ionizing radiation dose absorbed by an object, usually the human body. This applies both internally, due to ingested or inhaled radioactive substances, or externally due to irradiation by sources of radiation.

Internal dosimetry assessment relies on a variety of monitoring, bio-assay or radiation imaging techniques, whilst external dosimetry is based on measurements with a dosimeter, or inferred from measurements made by other radiological protection instruments.

Radiation dosimetry is extensively used for radiation protection; routinely applied to monitor occupational radiation workers, where irradiation is expected, or where radiation is unexpected, such as in the contained aftermath of the Three Mile Island, Chernobyl or Fukushima radiological release incidents. The public dose take-up is measured and calculated from a variety of indicators such as ambient measurements of gamma radiation, radioactive particulate monitoring, and the measurement of levels of radioactive contamination.

Other significant radiation dosimetry areas are medical, where the required treatment absorbed dose and any collateral absorbed dose is monitored, and environmental, such as radon monitoring in buildings.

== Measuring radiation dose ==
=== External dose ===
There are several ways of measuring absorbed doses from ionizing radiation. People in occupational contact with radioactive substances, or who may be exposed to radiation, routinely carry personal dosimeters. These are specifically designed to record and indicate the dose received. Traditionally, these were lockets fastened to the external clothing of the monitored person, which contained photographic film known as film badge dosimeters. These have been largely replaced with other devices such as Thermoluminescent dosimetry(TLD), optically stimulated luminescence(OSL), or Fluorescent Nuclear Tract Detector(FNTD) badges.

The International Committee on Radiation Protection (ICRP) guidance states that if a personal dosimeter is worn on a position on the body representative of its exposure, assuming whole-body exposure, the value of Personal Dose Equivalent Hp(10), is sufficient to estimate an effective dose value suitable for radiological protection. Personal Dose Equivalent is a radiation quantity specifically designed to be used for radiation measurements by personal dosimeters. Dosimeters are known as "legal dosimeters" if they have been approved for use in recording personnel dose for regulatory purposes. In cases of non-uniform irradiation such personal dosimeters may not be representative of certain specific areas of the body, where additional dosimeters are used in the area of concern.

A number of electronic devices known as Electronic Personal Dosimeters (EPDs) have come into general use using semiconductor detection and programmable processor technology. These are worn as badges but can give an indication of instantaneous dose rate and an audible and visual alarm if a dose rate or a total integrated dose is exceeded. A good deal of information can be made immediately available to the wearer of the recorded dose and current dose rate via a local display. They can be used as the main stand-alone dosimeter, or as a supplement to other devices. EPD's are particularly useful for real-time monitoring of dose where a high dose rate is expected which will time-limit the wearer's exposure.

In certain circumstances, a dose can be inferred from readings taken by fixed instrumentation in an area in which the person concerned has been working. This would generally only be used if personal dosimetry had not been issued, or a personal dosimeter has been damaged or lost. Such calculations would take a pessimistic view of the likely received dose.

=== Internal dose ===
Internal dosimetry is used to evaluate the committed dose due to the intake of radionuclides into the human body.

== Medical dosimetry ==
Medical dosimetry is the calculation of absorbed dose and optimization of dose delivery in radiation therapy. It is often performed by a professional health physicist with specialized training in that field. In order to plan the delivery of radiation therapy, the radiation produced by the sources is usually characterized with percentage depth dose curves and dose profiles measured by a medical physicist.

In radiation therapy, three-dimensional dose distributions are often evaluated using a technique known as gel dosimetry.

== Environmental dosimetry ==
Environmental dosimetry is used where it is likely that the environment will generate a significant radiation dose. An example of this is radon monitoring. The largest single source of radiation exposure to the general public is naturally occurring radon gas, which comprises approximately 55% of the annual background dose. It is estimated that radon is responsible for 10% of lung cancers in the United States. Radon is a radioactive gas generated by the decay of uranium, which is present in varying amounts in the Earth's crust. Certain geographic areas, due to the underlying geology, continually generate radon which permeates its way to the Earth's surface. In some cases the dose can be significant in buildings where the gas can accumulate. A number of specialised dosimetry techniques are used to evaluate the dose that a building's occupants may receive.

== Radiation exposure monitoring ==
Records of legal dosimetry results are usually kept for a set period of time, depending upon the legal requirements of the nation in which they are used.

Medical radiation exposure monitoring is the practice of collecting dose information from radiology equipment and using the data to help identify opportunities to reduce unnecessary dose in medical situations.

== Measures of dose ==
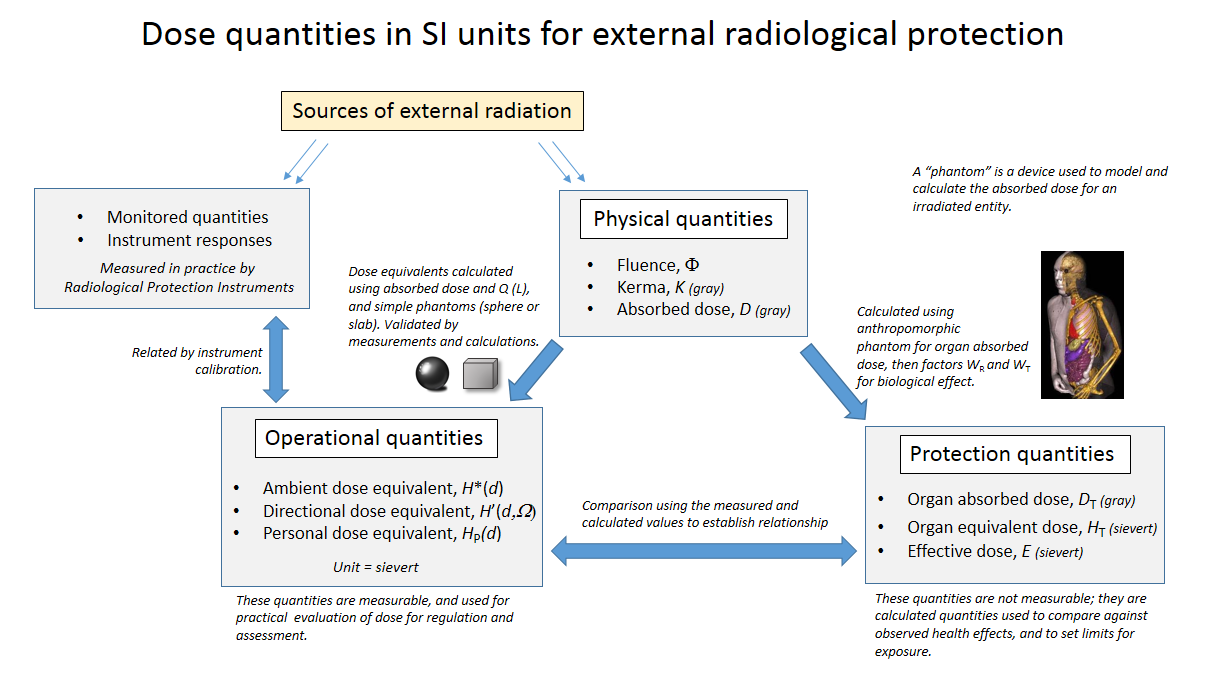
External radiation protection dose quantities in SI units

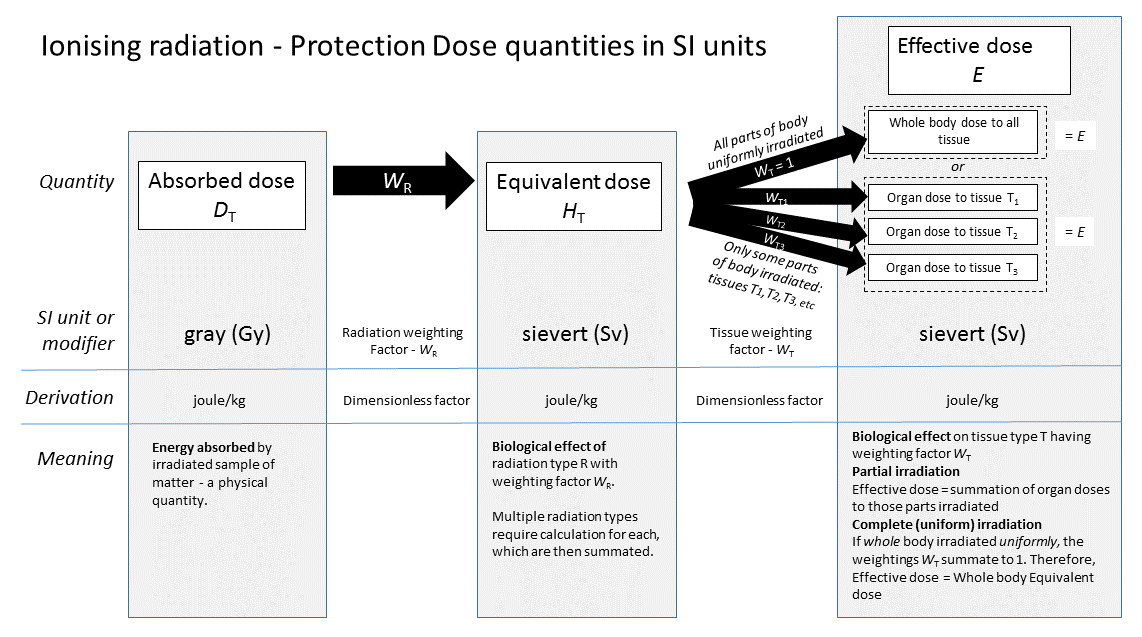
Graphic showing relationship of SI radiation dose units

To enable consideration of stochastic health risk, calculations are performed to convert the physical quantity absorbed dose into equivalent and effective doses, the details of which depend on the radiation type and biological context. For applications in radiation protection and dosimetry assessment the (ICRP) and the International Commission on Radiation Units and Measurements (ICRU) have published recommendations and data which are used to calculate these.

=== Units of measure ===
There are a number of different measures of radiation dose, including absorbed dose (D) measured in:

- gray (Gy) energy absorbed per unit of mass (J·kg^{−1})
- Equivalent dose (H) measured in sieverts (Sv)
- Effective dose (E) measured in sieverts
- Kerma (K) measured in grays
- dose area product (DAP) measured in gray centimeters^{2}
- dose length product (DLP) measured in gray centimeters
- rads a deprecated unit of absorbed radiation dose, defined as 1 rad = 0.01 Gy = 0.01 J/kg
- Roentgen a legacy unit of measurement for the exposure of X-rays

Each measure is often simply described as ‘dose’, which can lead to confusion. Non-SI units are still used, particularly in the USA, where dose is often reported in rads and dose equivalent in rems. By definition, 1 Gy = 100 rad and 1 Sv = 100 rem.

The fundamental quantity is the absorbed dose (D), which is defined as the mean energy imparted [by ionising radiation] (dE) per unit mass (dm) of material (D = dE/dm) The SI unit of absorbed dose is the gray (Gy) defined as one joule per kilogram. Absorbed dose, as a point measurement, is suitable for describing localised (i.e. partial organ) exposures such as tumour dose in radiotherapy. It may be used to estimate stochastic risk provided the amount and type of tissue involved is stated. Localised diagnostic dose levels are typically in the 0–50 mGy range. At a dose of 1 milligray (mGy) of photon radiation, each cell nucleus is crossed by an average of 1 liberated electron track.

=== Equivalent dose ===
The absorbed dose required to produce a certain biological effect varies between different types of radiation, such as photons, neutrons or alpha particles. This is taken into account by the equivalent dose (H), which is defined as the mean dose to organ T by radiation type R (D_{T,R}), multiplied by a weighting factor W_{R} . This designed to take into account the biological effectiveness (RBE) of the radiation type, For instance, for the same absorbed dose in Gy, alpha particles are 20 times as biologically potent as X or gamma rays. The measure of ‘dose equivalent’ is not organ averaged and now only used for "operational quantities". Equivalent dose is designed for estimation of stochastic risks from radiation exposures. Stochastic effect is defined for radiation dose assessment as the probability of cancer induction and genetic damage.

As dose is averaged over the whole organ; equivalent dose is rarely suitable for evaluation of acute radiation effects or tumour dose in radiotherapy. In the case of estimation of stochastic effects, assuming a linear dose response, this averaging out should make no difference as the total energy imparted remains the same.

Radiation weighting factors W_{R} (formerly termed Q factor) used to represent relative biological effectiveness according to ICRP report 103
Radiation	Energy	W_{R} (formerly Q)
x-rays, gamma rays, beta rays, muons		1
neutrons	< 1 MeV	2.5 + 18.2·e^{−[ln(E)]²/6}
neutrons	1 MeV – 50 MeV	5.0 + 17.0·e^{−[ln(2·E)]²/6}
neutrons	> 50 MeV	2.5 + 3.25·e^{−[ln(0.04·E)]²/6}
protons, charged pions		2
alpha rays, Nuclear fission products, heavy nuclei		20

=== Effective dose ===
Effective dose is the central dose quantity for radiological protection used to specify exposure limits to ensure that the occurrence of stochastic health effects is kept below unacceptable levels and that tissue reactions are avoided.

It is difficult to compare the stochastic risk from localised exposures of different parts of the body (e.g. a chest x-ray compared to a CT scan of the head), or to compare exposures of the same body part but with different exposure patterns (e.g. a cardiac CT scan with a cardiac nuclear medicine scan). One way to avoid this problem is to simply average out a localised dose over the whole body. The problem of this approach is that the stochastic risk of cancer induction varies from one tissue to another.

The effective dose E is designed to account for this variation by the application of specific weighting factors for each tissue (W_{T}). Effective dose provides the equivalent whole body dose that gives the same risk as the localised exposure. It is defined as the sum of equivalent doses to each organ (H_{T}), each multiplied by its respective tissue weighting factor (W_{T}).

Weighting factors are calculated by the International Commission for Radiological Protection (ICRP), based on the risk of cancer induction for each organ and adjusted for associated lethality, quality of life and years of life lost. Organs that are remote from the site of irradiation will only receive a small equivalent dose (mainly due to scattering) and therefore contribute little to the effective dose, even if the weighting factor for that organ is high.

Effective dose is used to estimate stochastic risks for a ‘reference’ person, which is an average of the population. It is not suitable for estimating stochastic risk for individual medical exposures, and is not used to assess acute radiation effects.

Weighting factors for different organs
Organs	Tissue weighting factors		
Organs	ICRP30(I36) 1979	ICRP60(I3) 1991	ICRP103(I6) 2008
Gonads	0.25	0.20	0.08
Red Bone Marrow	0.12	0.12	0.12
Colon	–	0.12	0.12
Lung	0.12	0.12	0.12
Stomach	–	0.12	0.12
Breasts	0.15	0.05	0.12
Bladder	–	0.05	0.04
Liver	–	0.05	0.04
Oesophagus	–	0.05	0.04
Thyroid	0.03	0.05	0.04
Skin	–	0.01	0.01
Bone surface	0.03	0.01	0.01
Salivary glands	–	–	0.01
Brain	–	–	0.01
Remainder of body	0.30	0.05	0.12

== Dose versus source or field strength ==
Radiation dose refers to the amount of energy deposited in matter and/or biological effects of radiation, and should not be confused with the unit of radioactive activity (becquerel, Bq) of the source of radiation, or the strength of the radiation field (fluence). The article on the sievert gives an overview of dose types and how they are calculated. Exposure to a source of radiation will give a dose which is dependent on many factors, such as the activity, duration of exposure, energy of the radiation emitted, distance from the source and amount of shielding.

=== Background radiation ===
The worldwide average background dose for a human being is about 3.5 mSv per year , mostly from cosmic radiation and natural isotopes in the earth. The largest single source of radiation exposure to the general public is naturally occurring radon gas, which comprises approximately 55% of the annual background dose. It is estimated that radon is responsible for 10% of lung cancers in the United States.

=== Calibration standards for measuring instruments ===
Because the human body is approximately 70% water and has an overall density close to 1 g/cm^{3}, dose measurement is usually calculated and calibrated as dose to water.

National standards laboratories such as the National Physical Laboratory, UK (NPL) provide calibration factors for ionization chambers and other measurement devices to convert from the instrument's readout to absorbed dose. The standards laboratories operates as a primary standard, which is normally calibrated by absolute calorimetry (the warming of substances when they absorb energy). A user sends their secondary standard to the laboratory, where it is exposed to a known amount of radiation (derived from the primary standard) and a factor is issued to convert the instrument's reading to that dose. The user may then use their secondary standard to derive calibration factors for other instruments they use, which then become tertiary standards, or field instruments.

The NPL operates a graphite-calorimeter for absolute photon dosimetry. Graphite is used instead of water as its specific heat capacity is one-sixth that of water and therefore the temperature increase in graphite is 6 times higher than the equivalent in water and measurements are more accurate. Significant problems exist in insulating the graphite from the surrounding environment in order to measure the tiny temperature changes. A lethal dose of radiation to a human is approximately 10–20 Gy. This is 10–20 joules per kilogram. A 1 cm^{3} piece of graphite weighing 2 grams would therefore absorb around 20–40 mJ. With a specific heat capacity of around 700 J·kg^{−1}·K^{−1}, this equates to a temperature rise of just 20 mK.

Dosimeters in radiotherapy (linear particle accelerator in external beam therapy) are routinely calibrated using ionization chambers or diode technology or gel dosimeters.

== Radiation-related quantities ==
The following table shows radiation quantities in SI and non-SI units.

Ionizing radiation related quantities
Quantity	Unit	Symbol	Derivation	Year	SI equivalent
Activity (A)	becquerel	Bq	s^{−1}	1974	SI unit
Activity (A)	curie	Ci	3.7×10^{10} s^{−1}	1953	3.7×10^{10} Bq
Activity (A)	rutherford	Rd	10^{6} s^{−1}	1946	1000000 Bq
Exposure (X)	coulomb per kilogram	C/kg	C⋅kg^{−1} of air	1974	SI unit
Exposure (X)	röntgen	R	esu / 0.001293 g of air	1928	2.58×10^{−4} C/kg
Absorbed dose (D)	gray	Gy	J⋅kg^{−1}	1974	SI unit
Absorbed dose (D)	erg per gram	erg/g	erg⋅g^{−1}	1950	1.0×10^{−4} Gy
Absorbed dose (D)	rad	rad	100 erg⋅g^{−1}	1953	0.010 Gy
Equivalent dose (H)	sievert	Sv	J⋅kg^{−1} × W_{R}	1977	SI unit
Equivalent dose (H)	röntgen equivalent man	rem	100 erg⋅g^{−1} × W_{R}	1971	0.010 Sv
Effective dose (E)	sievert	Sv	J⋅kg^{−1} × W_{R} × W_{T}	1977	SI unit
Effective dose (E)	röntgen equivalent man	rem	100 erg⋅g^{−1} × W_{R} × W_{T}	1971	0.010 Sv

Although the United States Nuclear Regulatory Commission permits the use of the units curie, rad, and rem alongside SI units, the European Union European units of measurement directives required that their use for "public health ... purposes" be phased out by 31 December 1985.

== See also ==
- Computational human phantom
- Health effects of radon
- Radiation dose reconstruction
