= Xenon-enhanced CT scanning =

- Purpose: determine changes in cerebral blood flow

Xenon-enhanced CT scanning is a method of computed tomography (CT scanning) used for neuroimaging in which the subject inhales xenon gas while CT images are made. The method can be used to assess changes in cerebral blood flow in the period shortly after a traumatic brain injury, or to detect or indicate the location of a stroke. Xenon acts as a contrast medium and the saturation of brain tissue is proportional to blood flow. This allows the estimation of blood flow to any given brain area based on imaging results.

Alternative applications of Xe-enhanced CT scans consist of using it as an inhaled contrast agent. This provides radiologists and image scientists the ability to assess [[[regional lung ventilation]]] which is helpful in the diagnosis of a variety of lung diseases such as COPD, lung fibrosis, pulmonary embolism, and even tumors in a similar fashion to radionuclide-based lung functional imaging techniques.
