= Dose profile =

In external beam Radiotherapy, transverse and longitudinal dose measurements are taken by a radiation detector in order to characterise the radiation beams from medical linear accelerators. Typically, an ionisation chamber and water phantom are used to create these radiation dose profiles. Water is used due to its tissue equivalence.

Transverse dose measurements are performed in the x (crossplane) or y (inplane) directions perpendicular to the radiation beam, and at a given depth (z) in the phantom. These are known as dose profiles. Dose measurements taken along the z direction create radiation dose distribution known as a depth-dose curve.

== See also ==
- Dosimetry
- Percentage depth dose curve
