= Minimum intensity projection =

Scientific visualization method

Schematic illustration of minimal intensity projection.

In scientific visualization, minimum intensity projection (MinIP) is a method for visualization of structures with low intensity in a specific volume. A two-dimensional image of a selected volume (for example all images that make up a 10 mm slab) is generated where each pixel is represented by displaying the lowest attenuation value in each voxel.

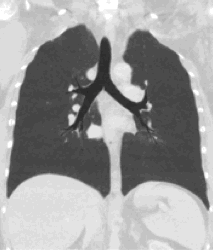
Example of a coronal MPR (slice thickness 10 mm) with minimal intensity projection. Air filled structures (especially bronchi) are enhanced.

MinIP is mainly used to diagnose lung diseases with computed tomography scans where the attenuation values are reduced (for example traction bronchectasis and emphysema). Another application is for assessing the bile tree and pancreatic duct which compared to the surrounding tissue is hypoattenuating (especially after intravenous contrast media administration).

== See also ==
- Maximum intensity projection
