= Percentage depth dose curve =

In radiotherapy, a percentage depth dose curve (PDD) (sometimes percent depth dose curve) relates the absorbed dose deposited by a radiation beam into a medium as it varies with depth along the axis of the beam. The dose values are divided by the maximum dose, referred to as d_{max}, yielding a plot in terms of percentage of the maximum dose. Dose measurements are generally made in water or "water equivalent" plastic with an ionization chamber, since water is very similar to human tissue with regard to radiation scattering and absorption.

Percent depth dose (PDD), which reflects the overall percentage of dose deposited as compared to the depth of maximum dose, depends on the depth of interest, beam energy, field size, and SSD (source to surface distance) as follows. Of note, PDD generally refers to depths greater than the depth of maximum dose

- PDD decreases with increasing depth due to the inverse square law and due to attenuation of the radiation beam
- PDD increases with increasing radiation field size due to greater primary and scattered photons from the irradiated medium
- PDD increases with increasing SSD because inverse square variations over a fixed distance interval are smaller at large total distance than small total distance

== See also ==
- Dosimetry
- Dose profile
