= Dose area product =

Quantity used to assess X radiation risk

Dose area product (DAP) is a quantity used in assessing the radiation risk from diagnostic X-ray radiography examinations and interventional procedures, like angiography. It is defined as the absorbed dose multiplied by the area irradiated, expressed in gray-centimetres squared (Gy·cm^{2} – sometimes the prefixed units dGy·cm^{2}, mGy·cm^{2} or cGy·cm^{2} are also used). Gray (Gy) is the SI unit of absorbed dose of ionizing radiation, while the milligray (mGy) is its subunit, numerically equivalent to the millisievert (mSv) as used to quantify equivalent and effective doses for gamma (γ) and X-rays.

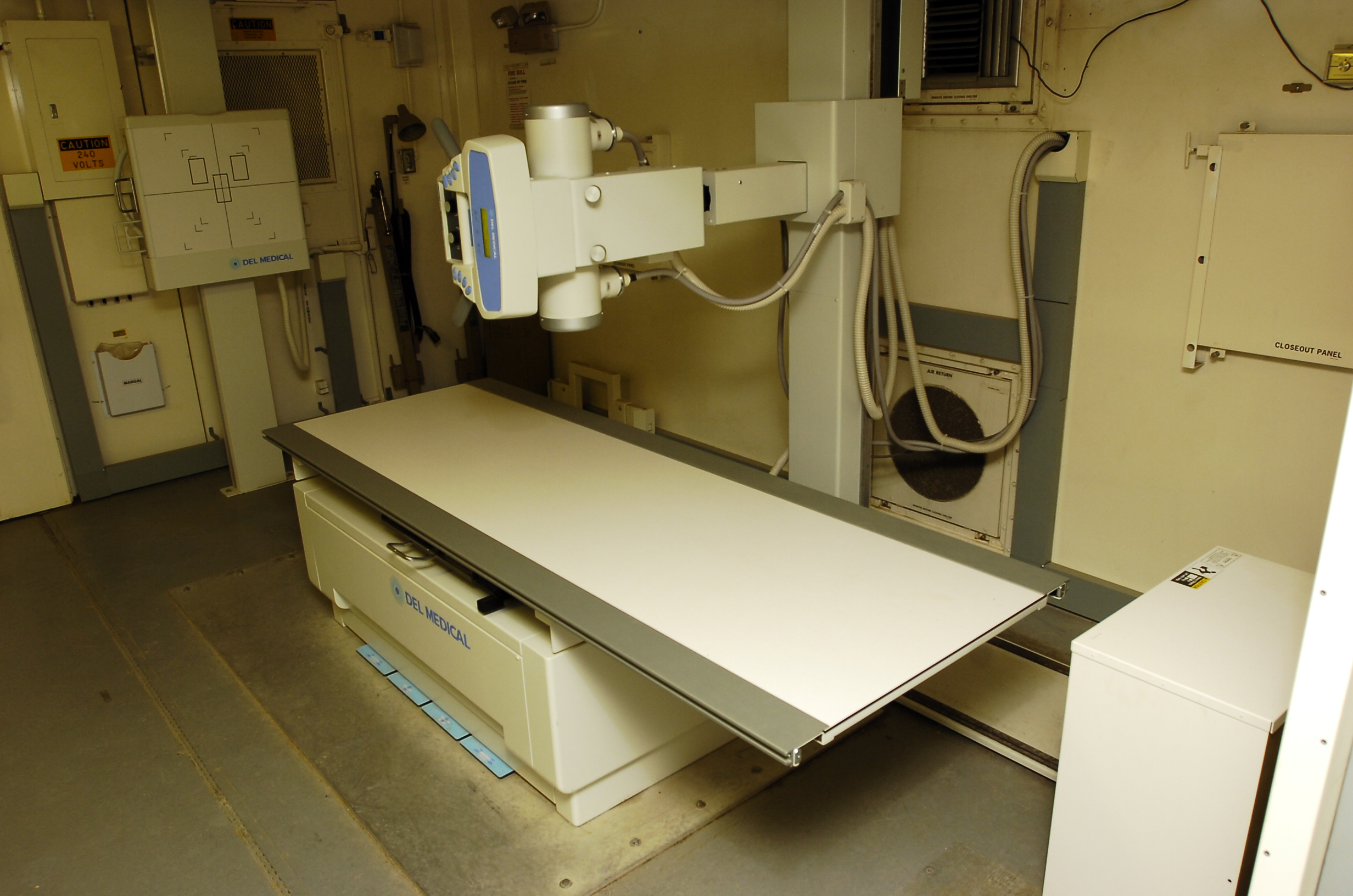
X-ray machine

Manufacturers of DAP meters usually calibrate them in terms of absorbed dose to air. DAP reflects not only the dose within the radiation field but also the area of tissue irradiated. Therefore, it may be a better indicator of the overall risk of inducing cancer than the dose within the field. It also has the advantage of being easily measured, with the permanent installation of a DAP meter on the X-ray set. Due to the divergence of a beam emitted from a "point source", the area irradiated (A) increases with the square of distance from the source (A ∝ d^{2}), while radiation intensity (I) decreases according to the inverse square of distance (I ∝ 1/d^{2}). Consequently, the product of intensity and area, and therefore DAP, is independent of distance from the source.

DICOM "X-Ray Acquisition Dose Module" metadata within each medical imaging study often includes various DAP and dose length product (DLP) parameters.

== How DAP is measured ==
An ionization chamber is placed beyond the X-ray collimators and must intercept the entire X-ray field for an accurate reading. Different parameters of the X-ray set, such as peak voltage (kVp), X-ray tube current (mA), exposure time, or the area of the field, can also be changed.
For example, a 5 cm × 5 cm X-ray field with an entrance dose of 1 mGy will yield a 25 mGy·cm^{2} DAP value. When the field is increased to 10 cm × 10 cm with the same entrance dose, the DAP increases to 100 mGy·cm^{2}, which is four times the previous value.

== Kerma Area Product ==
Kerma area product (KAP) is a related quantity, which for all practical radiation protection purposes is equal to dose area product. However, strictly speaking $\mathrm{DAP} = \mathrm{KAP} \times (1-g)$, where g is the fraction of energy of liberated charged particles that is lost in radiative processes in the material and the dose is expressed in absorbed dose to air. The value of g for diagnostic X-rays is only a fraction of a percent.

Adult coronary angiography and PCI procedures expose patients to an average DAP in the range of 20 to 106 Gy·cm^{2} and 44 to 143 Gy·cm^{2} respectively.

== See also ==
- Effective dose
- Equivalent dose
- Computed tomography dose index
