= 1865 (disambiguation) =

1865 may refer to:

- 1865 (number)
- 1865 AD/CE; a year (ISO year +1865; Holocene calendar year 11865; 135 BP)
- 1865 BC/BCE; a year (ISO year -1864; Holocene calendar year 8136; 2814 BP)
- 1865 Cerberus, an Apollo asteroid, near-Earth object; the 1865th asteroid registered
- Starr carbine Model 1865, a U.S. breechloading rifle
- Springfield Model 1865, a U.S. breechloading rifle
- Remington Naval Model 1865 Pistol, a U.S. Navy pistol
- 1865 battery, a battery size for lithium-ion batteries
- 1865 (podcast), a historical fiction podcast that ran from 2019 to 2021

== See also ==
- C/1865 B1, the Great Southern Comet of 1865
- 18650 (disambiguation)
- M65 (disambiguation)
- 65 (disambiguation)
