= Film badge dosimeter =

Device using photographic film to measure radiation exposure

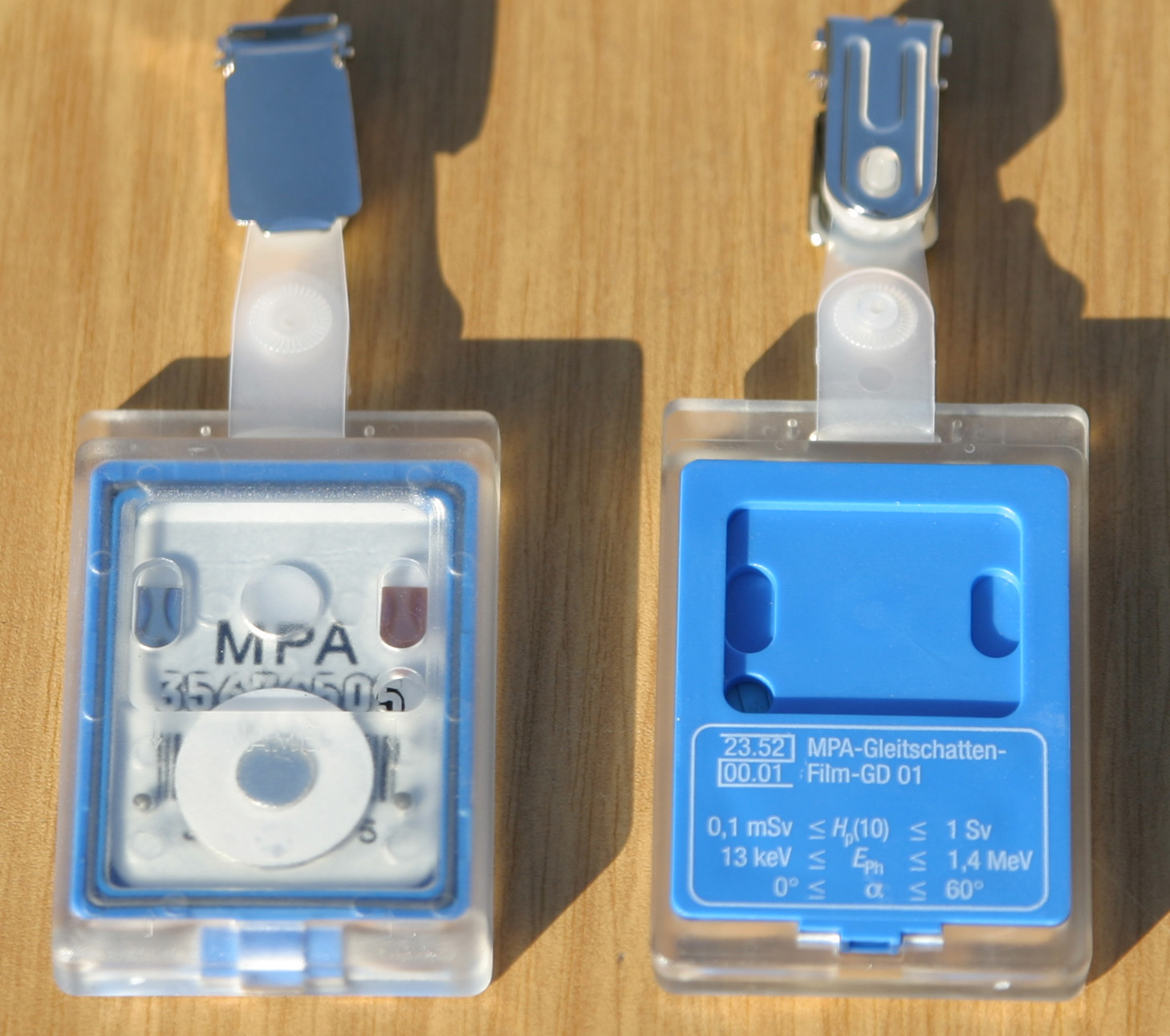
Film badge dosimeters

A film badge dosimeter or film badge is a personal dosimeter used for monitoring cumulative radiation dose due to ionising radiation.

The badge consists of two parts: photographic film and a holder. The film emulsion is black and white photographic film with varying grain size to affect its sensitivity to incident radiation such as gamma rays, X-rays and beta particles.

After use by the wearer, the film is removed, developed, and examined to measure exposure. When the film is irradiated, an image of the protective case is projected on the film. Lower energy photons are attenuated preferentially by differing absorber materials. This property is used in film dosimetry to identify the energy of radiation to which the dosimeter was exposed. Some film dosimeters have two emulsions, one for low-dose and the other for high-dose measurements. These two emulsions can be on separate film substrates or on either side of a single substrate. Knowing the energy allows for accurate measurement of radiation dose.

The device was developed by Ernest O. Wollan whilst working on the Manhattan Project, though photographic film had been used as a crude measure of exposure prior to this.

Though film dosimeters are still in use worldwide there has been a trend towards using other dosimeter materials that are less energy dependent and can more accurately assess radiation dose from a variety of radiation fields with higher accuracy.

== Description ==
The silver film emulsion is sensitive to radiation and once developed, exposed areas increase in optical density (i.e. blacken) in response to incident radiation. One badge may contain several films of different sensitivities or, more usually, a single film with multiple emulsion coatings. The combination of a low-sensitivity and high-sensitivity emulsion extends the dynamic range to several orders of magnitude. Wide dynamic range is highly desirable as it allows measurement of very large accidental exposures without degrading sensitivity to more usual low level exposure.

=== Film holder ===
The film holder usually contains a number of filters that attenuate radiation, such that radiation types and energies can be differentiated by their effect when the film is developed.

To monitor gamma rays or x-rays, the filters are metal, usually lead, aluminum, and copper. To monitor beta particle emission, the filters use various densities of plastic or even label material. It is typical for a single badge to contain a series of filters of different thicknesses and of different materials; the precise choice may be determined by the environment to be monitored. The use of several different materials allows an estimation of the energy/wavelength of the incident radiation.

Filters are usually placed on both the back and front of the holder, to ensure operation regardless of orientation. Additionally, the filters need to be sufficiently large (typically 5 mm or more) to minimize the effect of radiation incident at oblique angles causing exposure of the film under an adjacent filter. Normally it is worn at chest height under a lead apron to measure the radiation level the entire body has received.

== Usage ==
The badge is typically worn on the outside of clothing, around the chest or torso to represent dose to the "whole body". This location monitors exposure of most vital organs and represents the bulk of body mass. Additional dosimeters can be worn to assess dose to extremities or in radiation fields that vary considerably depending on orientation of the body to the source.

The dose measurement quantity, personal dose equivalent Hp(d), is defined by the International Commission on Radiological Protection (ICRP) as the dose equivalent in soft tissue at an appropriate depth, d, below a specified point on the human body. The specified point is specific to the position where the individual’s dosimeter is worn. Tissue depth of interest include the tissue depth of the live layer of skin (0.07 mm), lens of the eye, (0.30 cm), and "deep" dose, or dose to the whole body (1.0 cm).

The film badge is still widely used, but is being replaced by thermoluminescent dosimeters (TLDs), aluminium oxide based dosimeters, and the electronic personal dosimeter (EPD).

== See also ==
- Ionization chamber
- Proportional counter
- Geiger counter
- Sievert
- Semiconductor detector
- Thermoluminescent dosimeter
