= Electronic personal dosimeter =

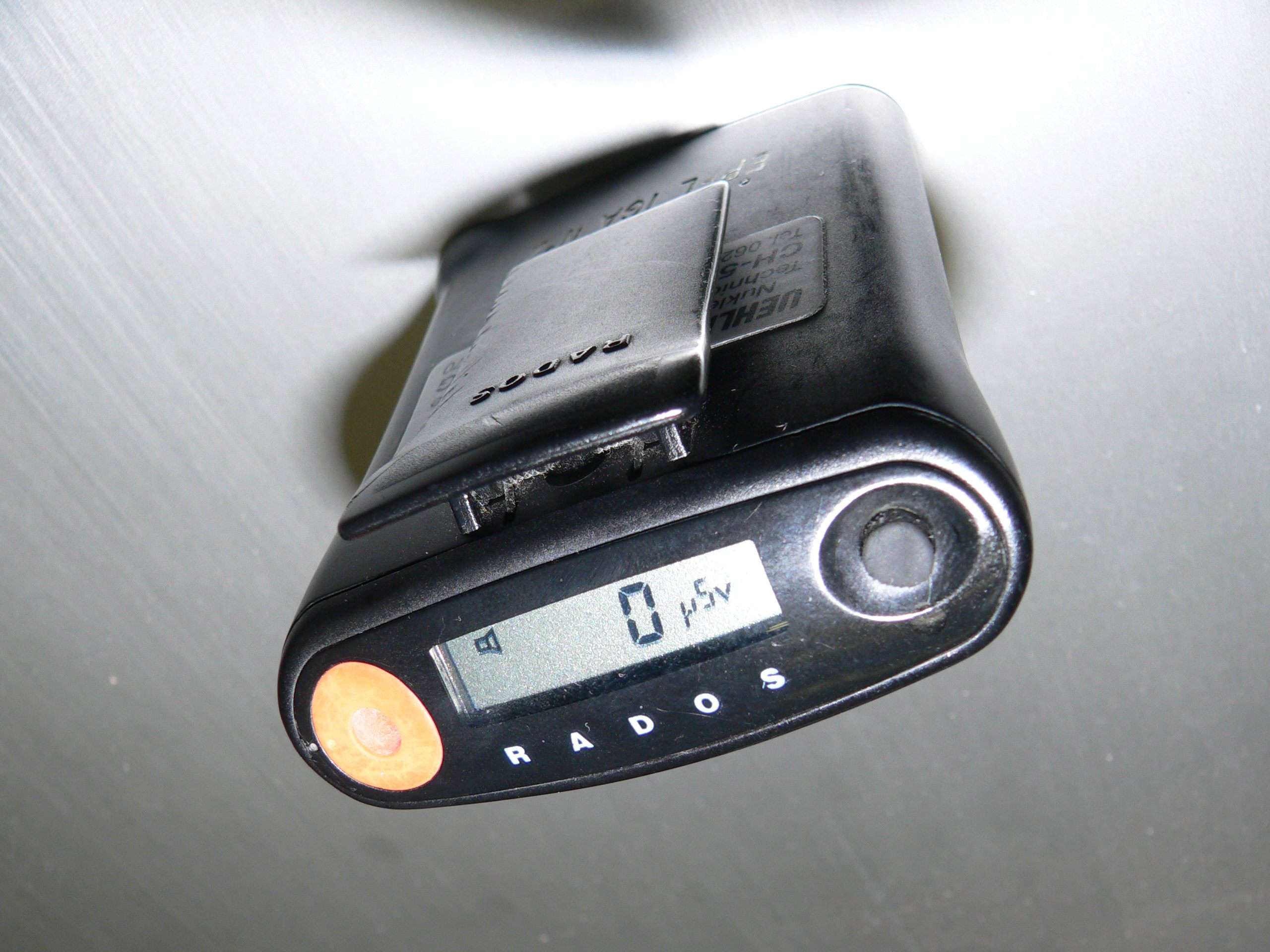
View of readout on an electronic personal dosimeter. The clip is used to attach it to the wearer's clothing.

The electronic personal dosimeter (EPD) is a modern electronic dosimeter for estimating uptake of ionising radiation dose of the individual wearing it for radiation protection purposes. The electronic personal dosimeter has the advantages over older types that it has a number of sophisticated functions, such as continuous monitoring which allows alarm warnings at preset levels and live readout of dose accumulated. It can be reset to zero after use, and most models allow near field electronic communications for automatic reading and resetting.

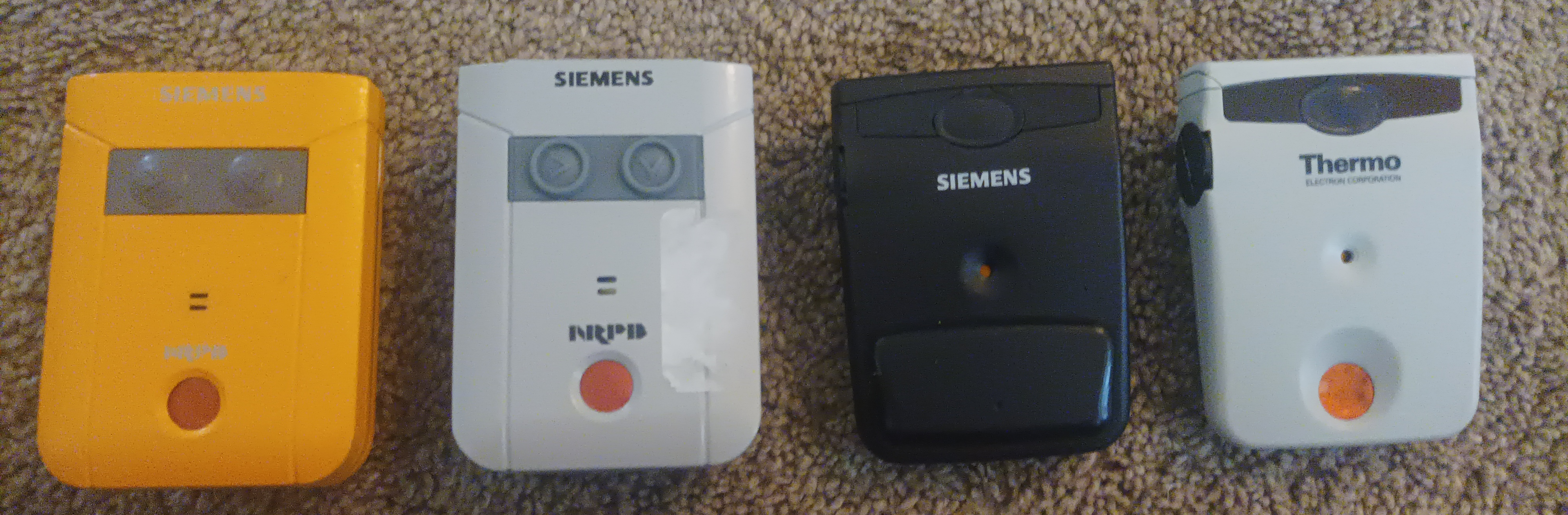
Four EPDs in chronological order

They are typically worn on the outside of clothing, such as on the chest or torso to represent dose to the whole body. This location monitors exposure of most vital organs and represents the bulk of body mass.

These are especially useful in high dose areas where residence time of the wearer is limited due to dose constraints.

== PIN dosimeter ==
PIN diodes are used to quantify the radiation dose for military and personnel applications.

== MOSFET dosimeters ==
MOSFET dosimeters are now used as clinical dosimeters for radiotherapy radiation beams. The main advantages of MOSFET devices are:

1. The MOSFET dosimeter is direct reading with a very thin active area (less than 2 μm).

2. The physical size of the MOSFET when packaged is less than 4 mm.

3. The post-radiation signal is permanently stored and is dose-rate independent.

The gate oxide of MOSFETs, which is conventionally silicon dioxide, is an active sensing material in MOSFET dosimeters. Radiation creates defects (which act like electron-hole pairs) in the oxide, which in turn affects the threshold voltage of the MOSFET. This change in threshold voltage is proportional to radiation dose. Alternate high-k gate dielectrics like hafnium oxide, hafnium dioxide and aluminium oxides are also proposed as radiation dosimeters.

== See also ==
- Quartz fiber dosimeter
- Thermoluminescent dosimeter
- Film badge dosimeter
- Comparison of dosimeters
