= 18650 (disambiguation) =

18650 may refer to:

- 18650 battery, a form factor size for rechargeable lithium-ion battery cylindrical cells
- (18650) 1998 FX_{10}; a main-belt asteroid, Asteroid 18650, the 18650th asteroid registered
- ISO 18650, an international standard on construction
- The number 18650

== See also ==
- 1865 (disambiguation)
