= Comparison of dosimeters =

The following table compares features of dosimeters.

Ionizing radiation dosimeters
Device	Photo	Mfg. country	Size, mm	Weight, g	Power supply	Display	Sound	Vibration	Detector type	Range, μSv/h	Range, μR/h	Measurement time, seconds	Measuring of beta and gamma radiation and range of energy	PC link	Extra features
Radmetron PM1211		Belarus	128x48x20	130	1 CR2450	LCD	Yes	No	Geiger–Müller tube	0.01 – 10e^{4}	1.14 – 11.4e^{6}		yes (48 keV – 3 MeV)	USB	
Radmetron PM1300		Belarus	85x57x21	95	AAA	LCD	Yes	Yes	Silicon PIN diode	0.01 – 10e^{6}	1.14 – 11.4e^{5}	0 – 20	X-ray and Gamma (15 keV – 20 MeV)	USB, RF-interface	GPS
Radmetron PM1300GN		Belarus	130х57х35	200	built-in rechargeable, or optional AAA	LCD	Yes	Yes	Silicon PIN diode, scintillator, silicon photomultiplier	0.01 – 10e^{3}	1.14 – 11.4e^{7}	0 – 20	Yes (0.025 eV – 15 MeV for neutron radiation, 15 keV – 20 MeV for photon radiation)	USB, RF-interface	
Radmetron PM1401GNM (Note: Russian: PM1401K-01M)		Belarus	195х57х32	450	1 АА	LCD	Yes	Yes	^{3}He, Geiger–Müller tube, CsI(Tl) scintillator	0.1 – 9999 ±20%		0.25	Yes (0.033 – 3 MeV for gamma, 0.025 eV– 14 MeV for neutron)	USB	
Radmetron PM1401MA		Belarus	110×62×38	320	1 АА	LCD	Yes	Yes	CsI(Tl) scintillator	0.05 – 40 ±20%		0.25	Yes (0.05 – 3 MeV)	USB	
Radmetron PM1401K-3		Belarus	262x60x65	820	2 АА	Color LCD	Yes	Yes	^{3}He, Geiger–Müller tube, CsI(Tl) scintillator	0.1 μSv/h – 100 mSv/h			Yes (150 keV – 3.5 MeV for beta radiation, 15 keV – 15 MeV for photon radiation)	USB	GPS
Radmetron PM1401K-3M		Belarus	262x60x65	820	2 АА	Color LCD	Yes	Yes	Geiger–Müller tube, CsI(Tl) scintillator	0.1 μSv/h – 100 mSv/h			Yes (150 keV – 3.5 MeV for beta radiation, 15 keV – 15 MeV for photon radiation)	USB	GPS
Radmetron PM1405P (Note: English name is not transliterated from Cyrillic. A transliteration would be "PM1405R")		Belarus	136×69×38	340	1 АА		Yes	No	Geiger–Müller tube	0.1 – 3e^{5} ±20%	11.4 – 34.2e^{6} ±20%		Yes (50 keV – 3 MeV)	USB	
Radmetron PM1603A		Belarus	50х56х19	85	1 CR2032	LCD with backlight	Yes	No	Geiger–Müller tube	0.01 – 10e^{3}	1.14 – 11.4e^{2}		Yes (48 keV – 3 MeV)	IR adapter	alarm clock, timer, stopwatch, calendar
Radmetron PM1603B		Belarus	50х56х19	85	1 CR2032	LCD with backlight	Yes	No	Geiger–Müller tube	0.01 – 10e^{3}	1.14 – 11.4e^{2}		Yes (48 keV – 3 MeV)	IR adapter	alarm clock, timer, stopwatch, calendar
Radmetron PM1611		Belarus	60×65×22	≤70	built-in rechargeable	LCD	Yes	Yes	Geiger–Müller tube	0.1 – 10e^{6} ±15%	11.4 – 11.4e^{8} ±15%	0 – 2	Yes (20 keV – 10 MeV)	USB	
Radmetron PM1611B		Belarus	60×65×25	≤80	AAA	LCD	Yes	Yes	Geiger–Müller tube	0.1 – 10e^{6} ±15%	11.4 – 11.4e^{8} ±15%	0 – 2	Yes (20 keV – 10 MeV)	USB	
Radmetron PM1621		Belarus	87х72х39	150	1 АА	LCD	Yes	No	Geiger–Müller tube	0.1 – 10e^{4} ±15%	11.4 – 11.4e^{6} ±15%		Yes (10 KeV – 20 MeV)	IR adapter	
Radmetron PM1621A		Belarus	87х72х39	165	1 АА	LCD	Yes	No	Geiger–Müller tube	0.1 – 10e^{5} ±15%	11.4 – 11.4e^{7} ±15%		Yes (10 KeV – 20 MeV)	IR adapter	
Radmetron PM1621M		Belarus	87х72х39	185	1 АА	LCD	Yes	No	Geiger–Müller tube	0.01 – 10e^{4} ±15%	11.4 – 11.4e^{6} ±15%		Yes (10 keV – 20 MeV)	IR adapter	
Radmetron PM1621MA		Belarus	87х72х39	185	1 АА	LCD	Yes	Yes	Geiger–Müller tube	0.01 – 10e^{5} ±15%	11.4 – 11.4e^{7} ±15%		Yes (10 KeV – 20 MeV)	IR adapter	
Ludlum Model 23		Texas, United States	112.8x30x12	55.9	CR2450	OLED	Yes	No	MOSFET	1 – 99.1e^{4} ≤±10%	114 – 11.4e^{7} ≤±10%		X-ray and Gamma	IR reader	
Ludlum Model 23-1		Texas, United States	112.8x30x12	55.9	CR2450	OLED	Yes	No	MOSFET	1 – 99.9e^{3} ≤±10%	114 – 11.4^{7} ≤±10%		Gamma and X-ray	IR reader	
Ludlum Model K8		Texas, United States	39x25x13	13	CR2032	LED	Yes	No	MOSFET		0.01 – 99.9e^{7}		gamma	No	
Ludlum Model 25		Texas, United States	76x54x17	144	2 lithium button cells	LCD with backlight	Yes	No	Geiger–Müller tube	0.1 – 87.6e^{5}	10 – 99.9e^{7}		Yes (60 keV – 2 MeV)		
Ludlum Model 25-1		Texas, United States	76x54x17	144	2 lithium button cells	LCD with backlight	Yes	No	Geiger–Müller tube	1 – 99.9e^{5}	114 – 11.4e^{8}		Yes (60 keV — 2 MeV)		
Ludlum Model 25-IS		Texas, United States	76x54x17	144	2 lithium button cells	LCD with backlight	Yes	No	Geiger–Müller tube	0.09 —87.6e^{5}	10 —99.9e^{7}		Yes (60 keV — 2 MeV)		
Ludlum Model 25-IS-1		Texas, United States	76x54x17	144	2 lithium button cells	LCD with backlight	Yes	No	Geiger–Müller tube	1 — 99.9e^{5}	114 — 11.4e^{8}		Yes (60 keV — 2 MeV)		
FNIRSI GC-01		Mainland China	120x78x27		1100mAh Lithium-ion battery	LCD with backlight	Yes	Yes	Geiger–Müller tube	0.01 — 50e^{3}	1 — 50e^{5}		combined, 48 keV - 1.5 Mev ≤ ±30%		Hydrogen Cyanide Detector
FNIRSI GC-02		Mainland China			850 mAh Lithium-ion battery	LCD with backlight	Yes		Geiger–Müller tube				Yes		
Radiascan 501		Russia	110х60х23	110	2 AAA battery	Color OLED display	Yes	No	Geiger–Müller tube Beta 1-1	0.01—10e^{3}	1—10e^{5}	1 — 60	No	Yes	food contamination tester, "background pattern analysis algorithm" (Note: Russian: оценка фона по заданному расписанию, lit. 'background assessment according to a specified schedule')
SA-05A		Switzerland	119x65x26.5	135	Built-in lithium polymer battery	LCD	No	No	Geiger–Müller tube LND 713	0.01–6000	No	1 – 60	0.05–1.3 MeV	USB	Clock, calendar and data logger
Radiascan 701		Russia	110х60х23	110	2 AAA battery	Color OLED display	Yes	No	Geiger–Müller tube Beta 1-1	0.01—10e^{3}	1—10e^{5}	1 — 60	Combined	USB	food contamination tester
ANRI 01-02 Sosna		Russia	133x82x45	350	Nine-volt battery	LCD	Yes	No	Two to four Geiger–Müller tubes	0.1–100	10–10e^{4}	20±5	Combined, 0.5–3.0 MeV	No	
bGeigie Nano		Japan	149x103x54	440	Li-Po	LCD	No	Yes	one Geiger–Müller tube	0–1000	0–100	1 – 60	Yes	USB, Bluetooth, and WiFi	Waterproof, Clock GPS, open-source
bGeigieZen Standard		Japan	165x98x52	450	replaceable 18650 3000mA + USB-C +QI wireless	IPS LCD with touchscreen	yes (can be switched on/off)	No	one LND7317 Geiger–Müller tube	0-1000	0-100	1 — 60	Yes	USB, Bluetooth, and WiFi	Waterproof, GPS, open-source. WiFi and BLE real time and upload of data.
bGeigieZen NFW	bGeigieZen NFW	Japan	165x98x52	450	replaceable 18650 3000mA + USB-C +QI wireless	IPS LCD with touchscreen	yes (can be switched on/off)	No	one LND7317 Geiger–Müller tube	0-1000	0-100	1 — 60	Yes	USB, Bluetooth, and WiFi	Waterproof, GPS, open-source. WiFi and BLE real time and upload of data.
DKG-RM1203M		Belarus	125x42x24	90	Two LR44	LCD	Yes	No	Geiger–Müller tube	0.01–2000	1–2*10e^{5}		No	Infrared	Clock with alarm
DKR-04			74х48х16	50	AAA	LCD	Yes	No	Semiconductor	0.1–10e^{6}	10–10e^{8}	4 — 256	No	No	
Ecotest DKG-21M		Ukraine	98×58×18	140	CR2450 Button cell		Yes		Geiger–Müller tube	0.1 – 10e^{5} ±15%			Yes (0.05 – 6 MeV)	infrared	
Ecotest DKG-24 "PRD Guarder"		Ukraine	60×110×30	250	2 АА	backlit monochrome display	Yes	Yes	CsI(Tl) scintillator, silicon semiconductor	0.01 – 10^{7}		10 – 90	Yes (0.02 – 10.0 MeV)	Bluetooth, USB	gyroscope, GPS
Ecotest MKS-03D "Swift"		Ukraine	111x73x28	200	2 АА	LCD with backlight	Yes	Yes	Geiger–Müller tube	0.1—105	10—107	4 — 128	Combined, 0.12—3.0 MeV Beta measurement range 5—105 min−1 cm−2	USB	Clock with alarm, optional case
Ecotest MKS-05 "Terra-P"		Ukraine	120×52×26	150	Two AAA	LCD	Yes	No	Geiger–Müller tube	0.1–1000	10–10e^{5}	5 — 70	Combined, 0.5–3.0 MeV	No	Clock with alarm, cover as option
Ecotest MKS-05 "Terra" (New edition)		Ukraine	120×52×26	150	Two AAA	LCD with backlight	Yes	Yes	Geiger–Müller tube	0.1–10e^{4}	10–10e^{6}	1 — 70	Combined, 0.5–3.0 MeV	Bluetooth	Clock with alarm, cover
Ecotest MKS-05 "Terra" (with Bluetooth channel)		Ukraine	120×52×26	150	Two AAA	LCD with backlight									
Ecotest MKS-UM		Ukraine	166×70×132 (control unit), 47×95×173 (probe)	70 (control unit), 30 (probe)			Yes		Geiger–Müller tube	1 – 10e^{6}			Yes (0.05 – 3 MeV)		
Ecotest RKS-01 "STORA-TU"		Ukraine	160×75×36	50	Two AAA		Yes		4 Geiger–Müller tubes	0.1 – 999.9				Bluetooth	
GQ GMC-300E +V4		Washington, United States			AA	LCD with backlight	Yes	No	One Geiger–Müller tube	328	32.8	1 — 60	Combined	USB	
GQ GMC-320 +V4		Washington, United States			AA	LCD with backlight	Yes	No	One Geiger–Müller tube	328	32.8	1 – 60	Combined	USB	gyroscope, temperature sensor
GQ GMC-320 +V5		Washington, United States			AA	LCD with backlight	Yes	No	One Geiger–Müller tube	328	32.8	1 – 60	Combined	USB	WiFi, logging to a server, gyroscope, temperature sensor
GQ GMC-300S		Washington, United States			AA	LCD with backlight	Yes	No	One Geiger–Müller tube	1000	100	1 – 60	Combined	USB	
GQ GMC-320S		Washington, United States			AA	LCD with backlight	Yes	No	One Geiger–Müller tube	1000	100	1 – 60	Combined	USB	gyroscope, temperature sensor
GQ GMC-SE		Washington, United States			AA	LCD with backlight	Yes	No	One Geiger–Müller tube	2000	200	1 – 60	Combined	USB	
GQ GMC-500		Washington, United States			18650	LCD with backlight	Yes	No	One Geiger–Müller tube	5000	500	1 – 60	Combined	USB	WiFi, logging to a server, gyroscope
GQ GMC-500+		Washington, United States	135x78x25		18650	LCD with backlight	Yes	No	Two Geiger–Müller tubes	0 – 42.5e^{3}	0 – 4.25e^{6}	1 – 60	Combined	USB	WiFi, logging to a server, gyroscope
GQ GMC-800		Washington, United States			AA	LCD with backlight	Yes	No	One Geiger–Müller tube	2000	200	1 – 60	Combined	USB	
GQ GMC-600		Washington, United States			18650	LCD with backlight	Yes	No	SBT-11	4250	425	1 – 60	Combined	USB	WiFi, logging to a server, gyroscope
GQ GMC-600+		Washington, United States			18650	LCD with backlight	Yes	No	LND 7317	10e^{3}	1000	1 – 60	Combined	USB	WiFi, logging to a server, gyroscope
GQ GMC-510		Washington, United States			18650	LCD with backlight	Yes	No	M4011	4250	425	1 – 60	Combined	USB	WiFi, logging to a server, gyroscope
GQ GMC-520		Washington, United States			18650	LCD with backlight	Yes	No	M4011	4250	425	1 – 60	Combined	USB	WiFi, logging to a server, gyroscope
GQ GMC-520+		Washington, United States			18650	LCD with backlight	Yes	No	M4011	4250	425	1 – 60	Combined	USB	WiFi, logging to a server, gyroscope
Radex RD1503, RD1503+		Russia	105х60х26	90	One or two AAA	LCD with backlight	Yes	Only RD1503+	Geiger–Müller tube	0.05 – 10	5 – 1000	up to 40	Combined, 0.1–1,25 MeV	No	
Radex RD1706		Russia	105х60х26	90	One or two AAA	LCD with backlight	Yes	Yes	Two Geiger–Müller tubes	0.05 –1000	5 – 10e^{5}	1 – 26	Combined, 0.1–1.25 MeV	No	Background mode
Radex RD1212		Russia	97x68x24	80	One or two AAA	LCD with backlight	Yes	Yes	One Geiger–Müller tube	0.05 – 999	5 – 10e^{5}	1 – 10	Combined, 0.4–3.5 MeV	USB	Background mode, integrated flashlight, time and date functions, multilingual
Radex RD1008		Russia	140х64х26	175	AA	LCD with backlight	Yes	Yes	Two Geiger–Müller tubes	0.1 – 1000	2 – 120	2 – 21	Separated, 0.05–3.5 MeV	No	Background mode, separated indication of beta and gamma radiation
RadiaCode 102		Republic of Cyprus	conflicting answers (124x35x20 or 123x34x18)	65	built-in Lithium polymer battery	LCD with backlight	Yes		CsI(Tl) scintillator	0.01 – 1000	1 — 10e^{5}	0.5	yes	USB and Bluetooth	thermometer, clock
RadiaCode 103		Republic of Cyprus	conflicting answers (124x35x20 or 123x34x18)	65	built-in Lithium polymer battery	LCD with backlight	Yes		CsI(Tl) scintillator	0.01 – 1000	1 — 10e^{5}	0.5	yes	USB and Bluetooth	thermometer, clock
RadiaCode 103G		Republic of Cyprus	conflicting answers (124x35x20 or 123x34x18)	70	built-in Lithium polymer battery	LCD with backlight	Yes		GAGG(Ce) Scintillator	0.01 – 1000	1 — 10e^{5}	0.5	yes	USB and Bluetooth	thermometer, clock
RadTarge II D300		Mainland China	69x46x17	60	Built-in lithium ion battery	LCD with backlight	Yes	Yes	YSO scintillator + SiPM	0.5 – 5000	50 – 5e^{5}	< 8	No, 0.03–1.5 MeV	USB	Dose equivalent rate + accumulated dose meter, pager-like clip, time and date functions, data logging and export (via Mac/PC software)
RadTarge II D700		Mainland China	69x46x17	60	Built-in lithium-ion battery	LCD with backlight	Yes	Yes	YSO scintillator + SiPM	0.01 — 1000	1 — 10e^{5}	< 2	No, 0.02–3 MeV	USB	Dose equivalent rate + accumulated dose meter, pager-like clip, time and date functions, data logging and export (via Mac/PC software)
RadTarge II D900		Mainland China	69x46x17	60	Built-in lithium-ion battery	LCD with backlight	Yes	Yes	YSO scintillator + SiPM	0.1 – 10e^{5}	10 – 10e^{7}	< 6	No, 0.02–3 MeV	USB	Dose equivalent rate + accumulated dose meter, pager-like clip, time and date functions, data logging and export (via Mac/PC software)
RKSB-104		Belarus	154х77х39	350	1 Nine-volt battery	LCD	No	No	Two Geiger–Müller tubes	0.1 — 100	10 — 2e^{4}	18 – 400	Combined, 0.5–3.0 MeV	No	
RKS-107		Belarus	154x77x39	350	1 Nine-volt battery	LCD	No	No	Geiger–Müller tube	0.1 — 99.99	10 — 9999				
Pripyat RKS-20.03		Ukraine							Two SBM-20 Geiger–Müller tubes						
DKG-RM1610		Belarus	58х58х18	70	Built-in accumulator	LCD	Yes	Yes	One Geiger–Müller tube	0.01 — 1.2e^{6}	1 — 1.2e^{8}		No	USB	Shock protection
EcotestCARD (Note: Named as Экотест ДКГ-21)		Ukraine		80	CR2450	LCD	Yes	No	Semiconductor	0.1–10e^{6}	10–10e^{8}			Infrared	
SOEKS 01M		Russia							Geiger–Müller tube						

== Literature ==
- "Intercomparison of personal dose equivalent measurements by active personal dosimeters" (PDF). International Atomic Energy Agency. Chicago. 2007.
- Bordy JM, Daures J, Clairand I, Denozière M, Donadille L, d'Errico F, Gouriou J, Itié C, Struelens L (2008). "Evaluation of the calibration procedure of active personal dosemeters for interventional radiology". Radiation Protection Dosimetry. 131 (1): 87–92. doi:10.1093/rpd/ncn225. PMID 18757898.
- "Comparison of Personal Dosimeters". Radiation Emergency Medical Management (REMM). United States Department of Health and Human Services.
