= CD V-700 =

Geiger counter

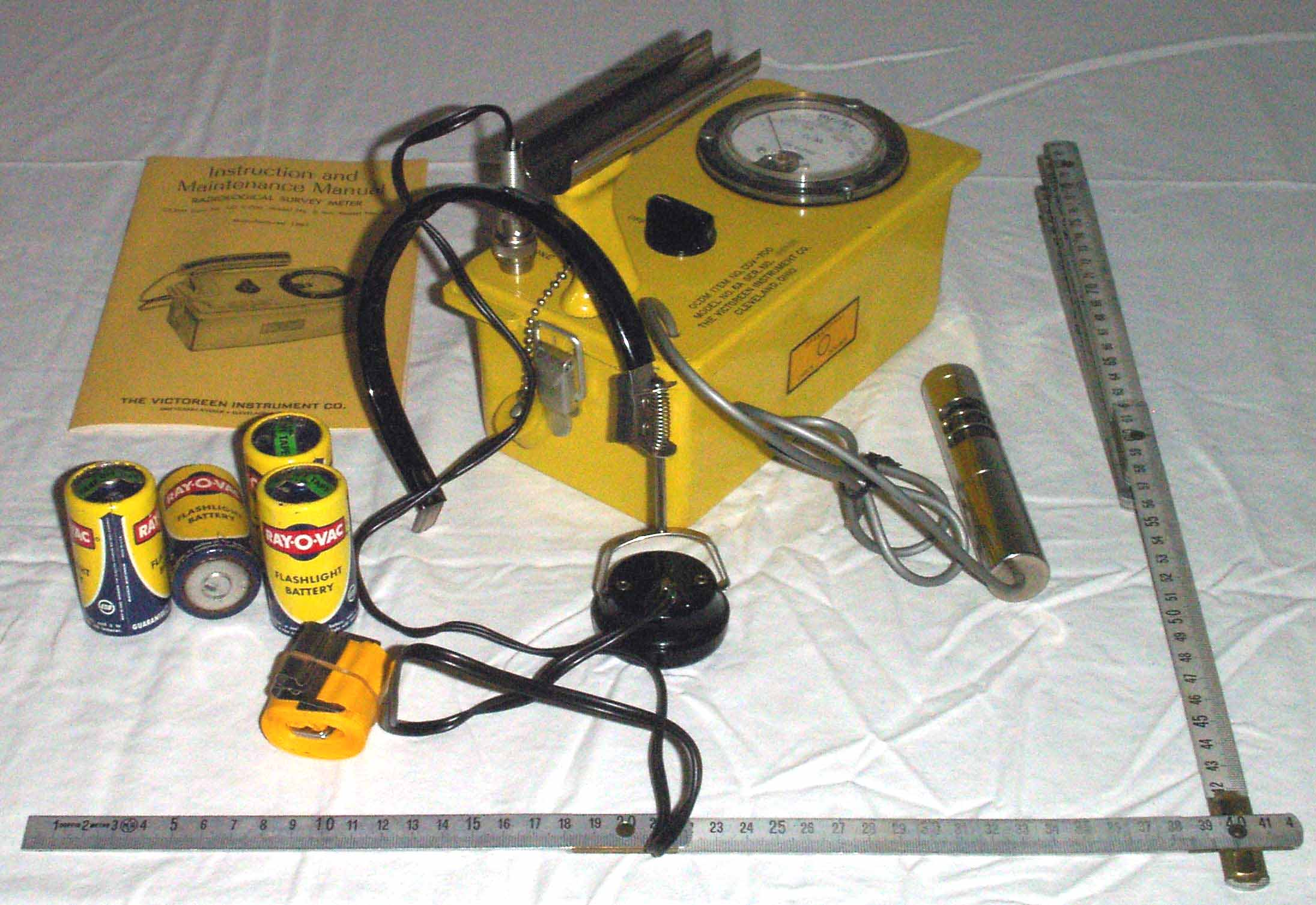
Victoreen CD V-700 overview

The CD V-700 (often written as "CDV-700") is a Geiger counter employing a probe equipped with a Geiger–Müller tube, manufactured by several companies under contract to United States federal civil defense agencies in the 1950s and 1960s. While all models adhere to a similar size, shape, coloring and form-factor, there were substantial differences between various models and manufacturers over the years the CD V-700 was in production. Many of the earlier units required the use of now-obsolete high-voltage batteries, and were declared obsolete by the end of the 1970s.

Tens of thousands of these units were distributed to US state civil defense agencies. Even though large numbers have been sold off as surplus to civilian users, many remain in use with first responders and state emergency management agencies today.

== Characteristics ==
=== Case and contents ===
Most models of the CD V-700 are constructed using a two-piece case made of die-cast and stamped aluminum with a distinctive yellow paint (John Deere Yellow), a Civil Defense “CD” decal and check source. The upper, die-cast part of the case contains a groove around the outer edge for a rubber gasket that renders the case water-tight. These have often deteriorated over the years but can be replaced with a section of rubber bead as used for mounting household screen windows in their frames. This section of the case also houses the meter, the printed circuit board and the battery holders. Mounted to the top of the upper case is a carry handle in which the probe clips in for storage, a connector for a headphone and the control knob.

The inside of the unit contains high voltage electronics of up to 900 volts, so care is recommended when operating with the case open. Inside the lower, stamped aluminum portion of the case is a printed diagram corresponding to the make and model of the unit that the lower case shipped with. In the decades since these units were made, it is common to find case bottoms have been switched between different makes and models, so the diagram may not match the actual mechanical and electrical properties of the unit.

Power is typically supplied by 2–5 D cell batteries, though early models used three B batteries in conjunction with two D-cell batteries. The most common cells employed are common alkaline primary batteries but rechargeable batteries can also be used. The common alkaline batteries have the disadvantage of a good chance of leakage of corrosive fluids when the unit is placed into storage for long periods, so it is advisable to remove the batteries for storage.

The units were shipped with a packet containing a silica gel to absorb any moisture inside the container and maintain the electronic components of the device. This packet should either be replaced or regenerated in an oven annually.

Unlike many newer devices of this type, the CD V-700s are not equipped with a visual or audible alarm for excessively high levels of radiation.

=== Probe ===
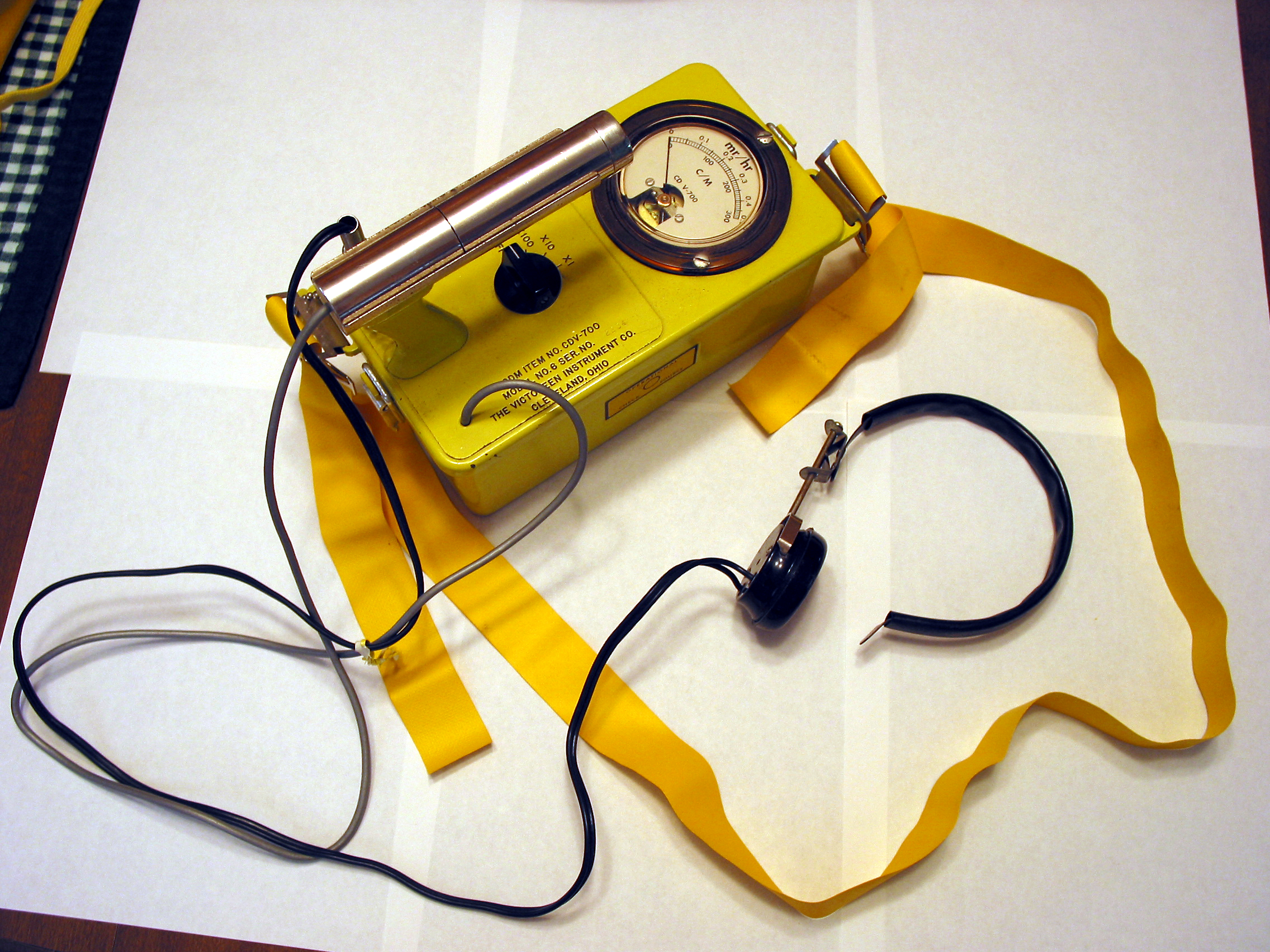
An example of the Victoreen CD V-700 geiger counter with strap and headphones.

The thin sidewall Geiger-Mueller (GM) tube enclosed within the brass probe body detects beta radiation and gamma radiation with the detecting probe's beta shield open, or gamma only when the shield is closed. The brass body of the probe has an energy-compensation effect on the readings taken from the probe, reducing the over-reporting of events from low-energy gamma radiation as can be encountered with non-compensated GM probes.

In the case of the common Victoreen 6A model, the tube employed in the probe is an EON 62l0, of metal construction and halogen-quenched. It is sensitive to both gamma and hard beta radiation. The tube is approximately 90 mm long, has a diameter of 8.5 mm and operates at a relatively high voltage of 900 volts. The choice of this tube is intended to strike a balance between sensitivity and ruggedness and detects gamma radiation at energy levels of between 20 and 1000 Kev. The analogue dial is calibrated in both milliroentgens per hour and Counts Per Minute (CPM). When new and in calibration, these units can be expected to deliver accuracy to within +/− 10%. There are 3 possible scales of reading:

- x1 (0–0.5 mR/h or 0–300 C/m)
- x10 (0–5 mR/h or 0–3000 C/m)
- x100 (0–50 mR/h or 0–30000 C/m)

A drop-in replacement for the EON 6210 or the 6993 tube is the LND 720, manufactured by LND, Inc. of New York, USA.

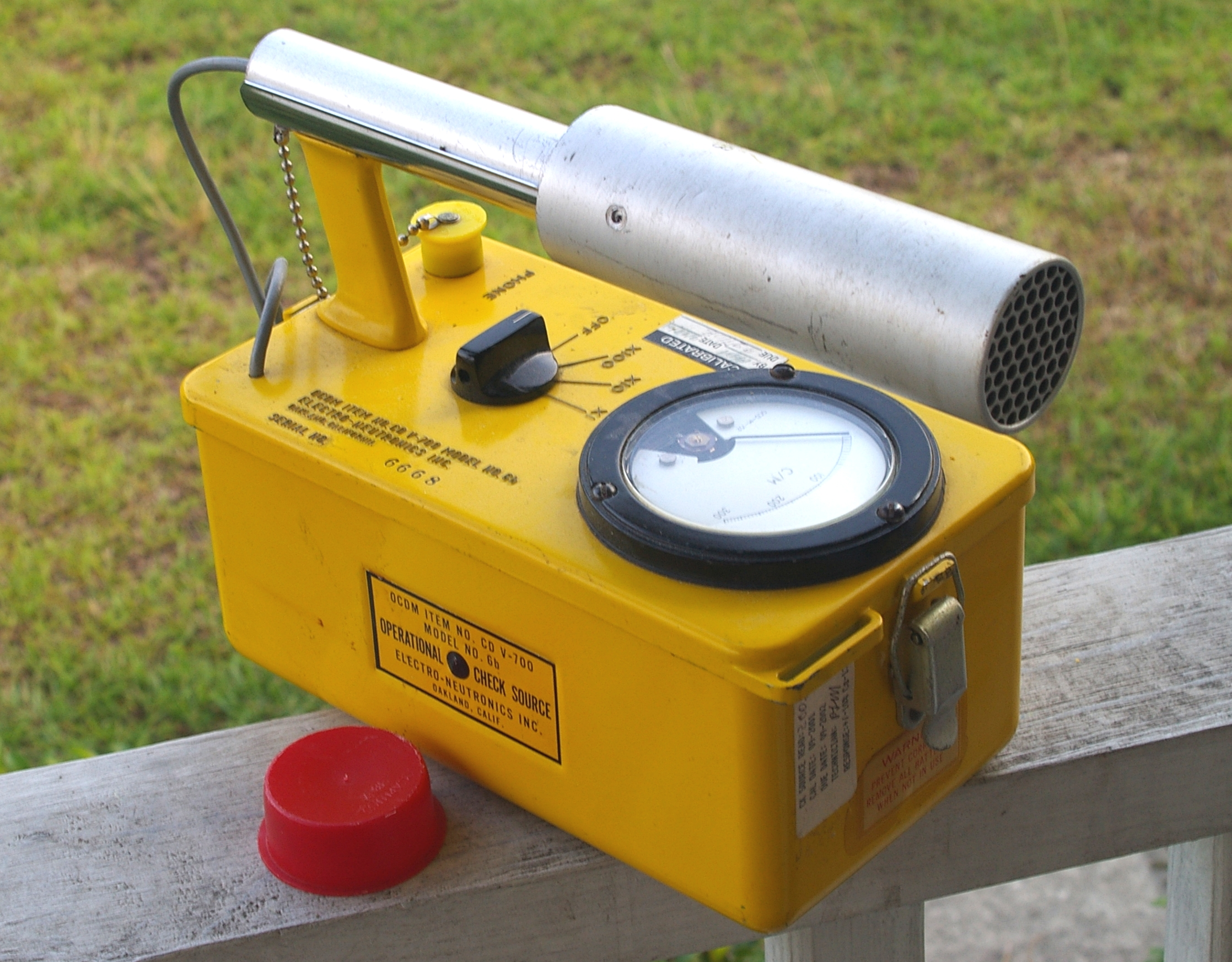
CD V-700M Geiger counter with alpha-sensitive end-window probe, also displaying protective red cap for the probe window and typical calibration decals. In this example, the meter face is altered to display Counts Per Minute only.

A small number of CD V-700s were modified by the addition of a much larger end-window probe to detect alpha radiation in addition to betas and gammas and which operated at considerably lower voltages, resulting to changes in the high voltage electronics. These units were redesignated as the CD V-700M and were issued on the basis of six units per state emergency management agency. Their primarily intended use was for detecting and cleaning up low-level radioactive contamination in state RADEF calibration laboratories, though they could be used to detect alpha radiation in the field, if needed.

=== Rate ===
The CD V-700 is used to detect low levels of radiation, 0 to 50 mR/h. High-radiation fields can saturate the Geiger tube, causing the meter to read a very low level of radiation (close to 0 R/h), thus inducing the user to erroneously believe conditions are safe when they are not.

=== Test ===
The CD V-700 also came with a "check source", a bit of a radioactive isotope under a sticker on the side of the unit. The isotope varied with the maker; depleted or natural uranium was common, though the Instruction and Maintenance Manual for the Lionel Model 6B indicates that a "Radium D+E beta source" with an approximate half-life of 22 years is present under the nameplate. This produced, at the time of installation on the machine, about 1–2 mR/hr adjacent to the source, a value which was clearly visible on the analog meter as well as audible via the headphones that accompanied the units. Measured with the probe's beta window uncovered and the probe directly in contact with the operational check source, this is about 100 times normal sea-level background levels of radiation, and similar to the near-field from a uranium oxide-glazed red Fiestaware saucer. The level drops back to background levels a few feet from the source. Since the half-life of the different operational check source materials used varied and since all CD V-700's were manufactured prior to 1964 and are now approaching a half-century old, the amount of radiation emitted from the source may be much lower than when the unit was originally issued. Therefore, accurate calibration via the source cannot be assured.

The units were calibrated at the factory, but this may drift over time and need to be recalibrated by means of an adjusting screw inside the case. The procedure for this will vary from model to model and it is best performed by somebody that is familiar with radiation metrology gear and its calibration. US state emergency management agencies usually maintain a calibration lab intended to keep the state's own inventory of such devices calibrated and often offer such services to local first responding agencies statewide but generally do not offer them to the public.

== Use ==
The CD V-700, as a true Geiger counter, is capable of measuring ambient background levels of gamma radiation and detecting the presence of beta radiation in the environment, and thus can be used to detect such common low-level radioactive artifacts as uranium-doped marbles, Fiestaware plates and radium watch faces. This differentiates them from other civil defense radiation meters such as the CD V-715, CD V-717 and CD-V-720, which are ion chamber meters that can measure gamma radiation levels far above (up to 500R/h) what the CD V-700 can (up to 50mR/h). Conversely, the ion chamber units are so insensitive to low-levels of gamma radiation that no legally exempt radiation source can make them register at all.

The CD V-700s were usually packaged in various combinations with the high-level ion chamber units as listed above in kits designated CD V-777. In their original Cold War application, the sensitive CD V-700s would be saturated and thus rendered useless by the high radiation levels expected after an exchange of nuclear weapons. In that setting, it would be the ion chamber units that received most of the use. The CD V-700s main purpose was as a peacetime training instrument and for use in checking food and shelter entrances for low levels of fallout contamination. Later, as the Cold War mission wound down, many CD V-700s were re-purposed as instruments for first responders to use at the scene of a radiological event or other incident.

As the CD V-700s produced for the US government are now over 50 years old, they are being slowly replaced by more modern instrumentation in US federal and state government stockpiles and these older units are being sold off as government surplus. This makes them inexpensive and very common in the US for use by uranium prospectors, physics teachers, radiation hobbyists and others interested in detecting and measuring ionizing radiation.

CD V-700s are relatively simple devices, with a circuit board that employs a few dozen electronics components, at most. Thus, the CD V-700 is a common target for various upgrades and modifications that enable added functionality. Most of the parts used are common off-the-shelf electronics parts, but some models employ transformers and other parts that were custom-made just for that particular make and model of CD V-700 and these can be difficult to locate and replace in the event of a failure. Considering their age, the CD V-700 is a fairly reliable device and are usually fairly easy to keep operational over time.

The battery limits the range of temperature at which the device works from between −10 degrees C and 40 degrees C.

== Related models and modifications ==
=== CD V-700M ===
The CD V-700M is a Model 6/6A/6B modified with an OCD-P-108 probe fitted with an OCD-D-109 GM tube that enables the detection of alpha radiation, in order to aid in decontamination.

ENI 6B's were most commonly used, though some Victoreens were converted as well.

The modification involved improvements to the high voltage circuit, lowering the voltage from 900 to 575 and replacing the meter with one labeled only in Counts Per Minute.

=== Ludlum "CD V-700 Model 7" ===
The CD V-700 Model 7 is a kit to upgrade and modernize the Lionel Model 6B, Lionel/Anton Model 6, or Electro-Neutronics 6B with electronics derived from a recent version of the Ludlum Model 3 Geiger counter. The kit includes a new main electronics board with rotary switch, a connector for a detachable external probe, a wiring harness and switches to add new functionality and improved reliability to aging CD V-700s. The upgrade requires substantial modifications to the case. The State of Florida Department of Public Health has modified a large number of their CD V-700s to this standard.

The kit has the following ranges:

- x1 (0-0.5 mR/h or 0-300 C/m)
- x10 (0-5 mR/h or 0-3000 C/m)
- x100 (0-50 mR/h or 0-30000 C/m)
- x1000 (0-500 mR/h or 0-300000 C/m)

=== OCD-D-101 ===
The OCD-D-101 is a GM tube replacement kit for the CD V-700 introduced in 1963.

The kit, which was produced by Lionel Electronic Labs and EON Corporation, is designed to decrease the sensitivity of Model 6, 6A & 6B meters by ten times.

This would result in the following ranges:

- x10 (0-5 mR/h or 0-3000 C/m)
- x100 (0-50 mR/h or 0-30000 C/m)
- x1000 (0-500 mR/h or 0-300000 C/m)

One or two pressure-sensitive metal foil labels were included to indicate the new range scale.

=== Victoreen 496 ===
Victoreen Model 496 as purchased by the United States Department of Energy in the 1980s.

Victoreen produced their Model 496 in the 1980s and many were purchased by the United States Department of Energy. The 496 used a modified version of the same casing as the CD V-700 Model 6Bs that Victoreen had produced in the 1960s. If the decal on top of a Model 496 is removed, the markings of the older civil defense meter can be found cast into the top cover. However, the 496 features a number of improvements over any of the older civil defense versions, including modernized electronics, a BNC connector or MHV connector for external probes, a built-in speaker with on-off knob, a built-in battery test circuit, and a meter face graduated in Counts Per Minute for use with various probes. Other 490-series Victoreen models of the same era shared similar physical characteristics but varied considerably in their features.

== List of manufacturers, models and respective years of manufacture ==
Manufacturer	Model	First Manufactured	Batteries	GM Tube(s)	Source(s)	Notes
Nuclear Research Corp.	CD V-700 (SM-5A)	1954	A (x1), B (x2 22.5v, 1x 67.5v)	Raytheon CK 1043	Strontium 90 (20 mR/h)	Rejected model?
Nuclear Measurements Corp.	CD V-700 Model 1 (GS-3CD)	1954-1955	D (x2), B (x3, 45v)	Radiation Cntr. Labs Mark 1 Model 22		
Victoreen Instrument Co.	CD V-700 Model 2 (661)	1956	D (x2), B (x3, 45v)	Radiation Cntr. Labs Mark 1 Model 22		
International Pump and Machine Works	CD V-700 Model 3 (IP-700)	1957	D (x2), B (x3, 45v)	Amperex 85NB		
Chatham Electronics	CD V-700 Model 3 (CH-700)	1957	D (x2), B (x3, 45v)			
Universal Atomics	CD V-700 Model 4	1957-1958	D (x5)	Anton 114/6993		Plastic Case
Anton Electronics Labs Inc.	CD V-700 Model 5	1959-1960	D (x5)	Anton 114/6993		
Anton Electronics Labs Inc.	CD V-700 Model 6	1960	D (x5)	Anton 114/6993		
Lionel Electronic Laboratories	CD V-700 Model 6	1960	D (x5)			
Victoreen Instrument Co.	CD V-700 Model 6	1960	D (x4)	Victoreen 6993		
Victoreen Instrument Co.	CD V-700 Model 6A	1961	D (x4)	Victoreen 6993		
Victoreen Instrument Co.	CD V-700 Model 6B	1962	D (x4)	Victoreen 6993		
Electro-Neutronics Inc.	CD V-700 Model 6B	1962	D (x4)	Lionel or EON 6993		
Lionel Electronic Laboratories	CD V-700 Model 6B	1962	D (x2)	Lionel 6993		
