= Great Southern Comet of 1865 =

Sungrazing comet

C/1865 B1 (Abbott) (Great Southern Comet of 1865)
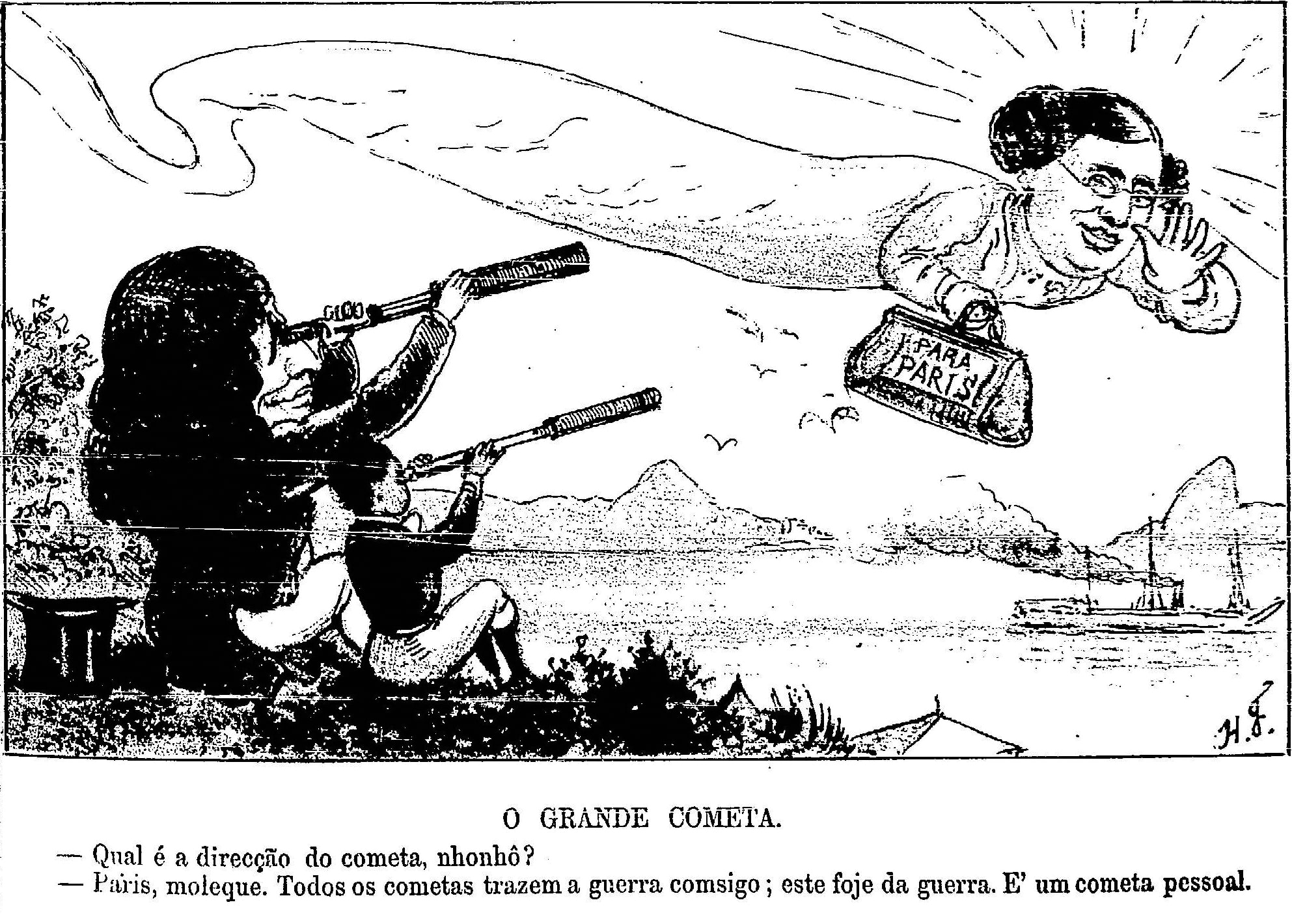
- Brazilian political cartoon from February 1865 stating that the comet, usually a harbinger of war, was actually going to Paris to escape the Uruguayan and Paraguayan Wars Brazil was fighting at the time.

Discovery
- Discovered by: Francis Abbott
- Discovery site: Hobart, Australia
- Discovery date: 17 January 1865

Designations
- Alternative designations: 1865 I

Orbital characteristics
- Epoch: 14 January 1865 (JD 2402251.3253)
- Observation arc: 102 days
- Number of observations: 198
- Perihelion: 0.025844 AU
- Eccentricity: ~1.000
- Inclination: 92.4945°
- Longitude of ascending node: 254.825°
- Argument of periapsis: 111.717°
- Last perihelion: 14 January 1865

Physical characteristics
- Mean radius: 2.55 km (1.58 mi) (Note: Calculated mean radius using the formula: $\log_{10}\,(\,R\,)\ =\;0.9 +\;0.13 (\,H\,)$ Where $\,H\,$ is the comet's absolute total magnitude (M1))
- Comet total magnitude (M1): 3.8
- Apparent magnitude: 1.0 (1865 apparition)

The Great Southern Comet of 1865, also known as C/1865 B1 by its modern nomenclature, was a non-periodic comet, which in 1865 was so bright that it was visible to unaided-eye observations in the Southern Hemisphere. The comet could not be seen from the Northern Hemisphere.

== Discovery and observations ==
The comet was a naked-eye discovery on January 17 by Francis Abbott in Hobart, Tasmania. The comet was independently discovered by Robert L. J. Ellery in Melbourne and observers in South Africa, Chile and Brazil. In addition to Abbott and Ellery, John Tebbutt in Windsor, New South Wales, Carl Wilhelm Moesta (1825–1884) in Santiago, C. C. Copsey in São João del Rei, and William Mann (1817–1873) at the Cape of Good Hope made telescope observations of this comet. At the first observations, the comet’s tail had a length of from 10° to 12°.

Before its discovery, the comet reached its perihelion and its closest approach to planet Earth. From its discovery and through the end of January the comet was visible, in the Southern Hemisphere, to the naked eye. Ellery in Melbourne described the comet as “not nearly so bright” as Donati’s Comet. The maximum length reported for the tail was 25° on January 21. At the end of January the tail's length was about 17°.

In the Southern Hemisphere, the comet was visible to the naked eye for the entire month of February. At the beginning of March, the tail was barely ½° and soon the comet could be observed only by telescope. William Mann at the Cape of Good Hope successfully observed the comet through April and until May 2.

On 24 January, the comet reached its maximum brightness of magnitude 1.

== Orbit ==
Using observations of the comet over 102 days, Felix Körber was able to calculate only a parabolic orbit, inclined to the ecliptic by about 92°. The comet reached its perihelion of approximately 0.026 AU on January 14 and then on January 15 its closest approach to planet Earth of approximately 0.94 AU. On January 16 the comet passed by Venus at a distance of approximately 0.67 AU.

== Tebbutt's summary ==
In the section of his Astronomical Memoirs entitled 1865, Tebbutt wrote:

In January of this year a brilliant comet appeared, which, from its position, could not be seen in the northern hemisphere. It was observed at five stations only, namely, Cape of Good Hope, Melbourne, Port de France, Santiago, and Windsor. It was observed at Windsor with the 3 1/4 inch telescope from January 30 to March 23, and the observations, with the derived orbit elements, were forwarded to Europe. The most remarkable feature in the orbit of this comet is the smallness of the perihelion distance, for my other observations showed that the comet passed its perihelion on the morning of January 15, at a distance of only two and a half millions of miles from the sun; its perihelion velocity was enormous and by January 30, when first seen by me, it had receded to a distance of 63 millions of miles from that luminary and 114 millions of miles from the earth, and its visible tail had a length of 35 millions of miles. Approximate orbits for this body were calculated by Hind, Kulcycky, Moesta, Tebbutt, and White, and all the publications were employed by Dr. Koerber of Breslau in 1887; in a definitive determination, which formed the subject of an inaugural dissertation read by him before the University of that city on the occasion of his taking the degree of doctor of philosophy. The provisional orbit elements adopted for the discussion were those obtained at Windsor and the final correction was small.
