= Ludlum Measurements =

Company in Sweetwater, United States

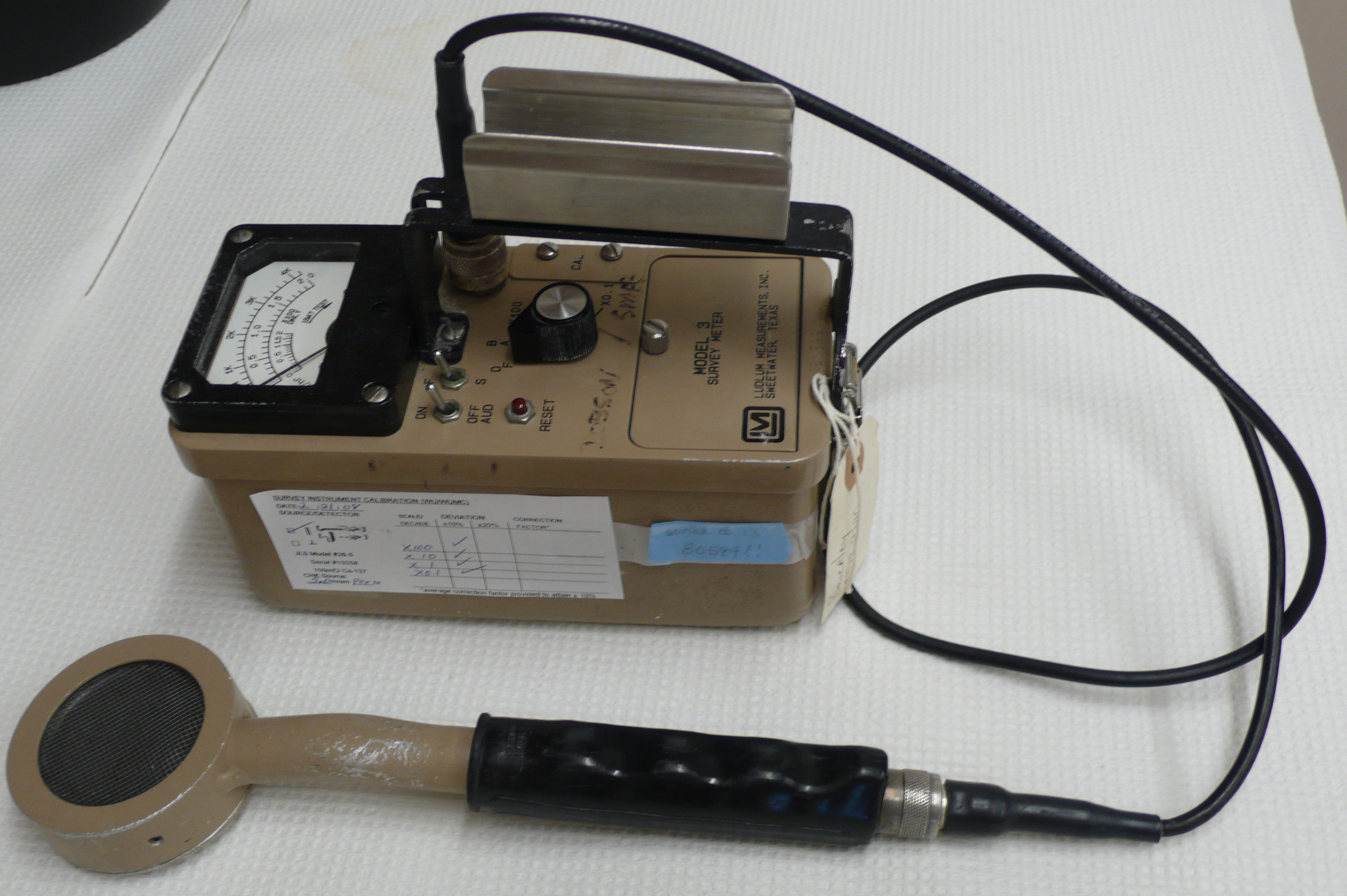
A Ludlum geiger counter

Ludlum Measurements is an American manufacturer of radiation detection and monitoring equipment such as geiger counters, scintillation counters, dosimeters, and other radiation detection equipment.

== Overview ==
The company is based in Sweetwater, Texas, and was founded in 1962 by Don Ludlum (1932–2015) who had previously worked for Eberline, another manufacturer of radiation detectors. Geiger counters manufactured by the company are recognized as a standard reference instrument in the fields of occupational safety where exposure to ionizing radiation is a concern.
