= Francis Abbott =

Australian astronomer

- Born: 12 August 1799; Derby, England
- Died: 18 February 1883 (aged 83); Hobart, Tasmania
- Occupations: Watch, Clock and Instrument Maker, astronomer

Francis Abbott (12 August 1799 – 18 February 1883) was an Australian astronomer.

== Biography ==
Abbott was born in Derby, England and became a watchmaker there. In 1831 he moved to Manchester and manufactured timepieces and astronomical machinery. In 1844, he was found guilty of obtaining two watches under false pretenses, and was sent to Australia. He arrived in Hobart, Tasmania in 1845, where he eventually again became a maker of watches and clocks. Abbott set up a private observatory where he made astronomical and meteorological observations. He published a number of papers in astronomical journals about comets, transits, and other matters. In an 1863 paper in Monthly Notices of the Royal Astronomical Society, he claimed that the Eta Carinae nebula had changed shape and size since Herschel observed it in the 1830s. This claim was refuted by Richard Proctor in 1871. This almost destroyed his credibility and he ceased publishing papers in European journals in 1873, deciding instead to write popularized astronomy booklets. He died in Hobart. He was originally buried in the Congregational Cemetery in South Hobart with some members of his family. Sometime after 1902 the Congregational Cemetery was closed and the remains were removed.

Abbott was Tasmania's de facto government astronomer and meteorologist from 1855 to 1880, and he was a member of the Royal Society of Tasmania, the Royal Astronomical Society, and the Royal Meteorological Society.
