= M65 =

M65 or M-65 may refer to:

== Military ==
- Iveco LMV, an Italian-designed four-wheel drive tactical vehicle in service with several countries
- M65 atomic cannon, a towed artillery piece
- M65 Jacket, a multi-temperate jacket designed for the US Armed forces
- M65 recoilless nuclear rifle, a nuclear warhead for recoilless rifles
- Soltam M-65, an Israeli mortar
- Tikka M65, a Finnish rifle

== Transportation ==
- M65 motorway, a motorway in England
- M-65 (Michigan highway), a Michigan state highway
- Miles M.65 Gemini, a 1945 British twin-engined four-seat touring aircraft
- M65 (Durban), a road in Durban, South Africa

== Other uses ==
- Envelope, size with dimensions 110mm × 220mm
- Messier 65, a spiral galaxy in the constellation Leo
- M 65, an age group for Masters athletics (athletes aged 35+)
