= Thermoluminescent dosimeter =

Type of radiation dosimeter

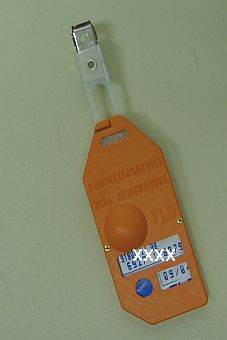
A thermoluminescent dosimeter (TLD)

A thermoluminescent dosimeter, or TLD, is a type of radiation dosimeter, consisting of a piece of a thermoluminescent crystalline material inside a radiolucent package.

When a thermoluminescent crystal is exposed to ionizing radiation, it absorbs and traps some of the energy of the radiation in its crystal lattice. When heated, the crystal releases the trapped energy in the form of visible light, the intensity of which is proportional to the intensity of the ionizing radiation to which the crystal was exposed. A specialized detector measures the intensity of the emitted light, and this measurement is used to calculate the dose of ionizing radiation the crystal was exposed to. Since the crystal density is similar to human soft tissue density, the dose measurement can be used to calculate absorbed dose.

Materials exhibiting thermoluminescence in response to ionizing radiation include calcium fluoride, lithium fluoride, calcium sulfate, lithium borate, calcium borate, potassium bromide, and feldspar. It was invented in 1954 by Professor Farrington Daniels of the University of Wisconsin-Madison.

== Types ==
The two most common types of TLDs are calcium fluoride and lithium fluoride, with one or more impurities to produce trap states for energetic electrons. The former is used to record gamma exposure, the latter for gamma and neutron exposure (indirectly, using the Li-6 (n,alpha) nuclear reaction; for this reason, LiF dosimeters may be enriched in lithium-6 to enhance this effect or enriched in lithium-7 to reduce it). Other types include beryllium oxide, and calcium sulfate doped with thulium.

As the radiation interacts with the crystal it causes electrons in the crystal's atoms to jump to higher energy states, where they stay trapped due to intentionally introduced impurities (usually manganese or magnesium) in the crystal, until heated. Heating the crystal causes the electrons to drop back to their ground state, releasing a photon of energy equal to the energy difference between the trap state and the ground state.
