= 18650 battery =

Cylindrical battery size

18650 battery; 1865 cell
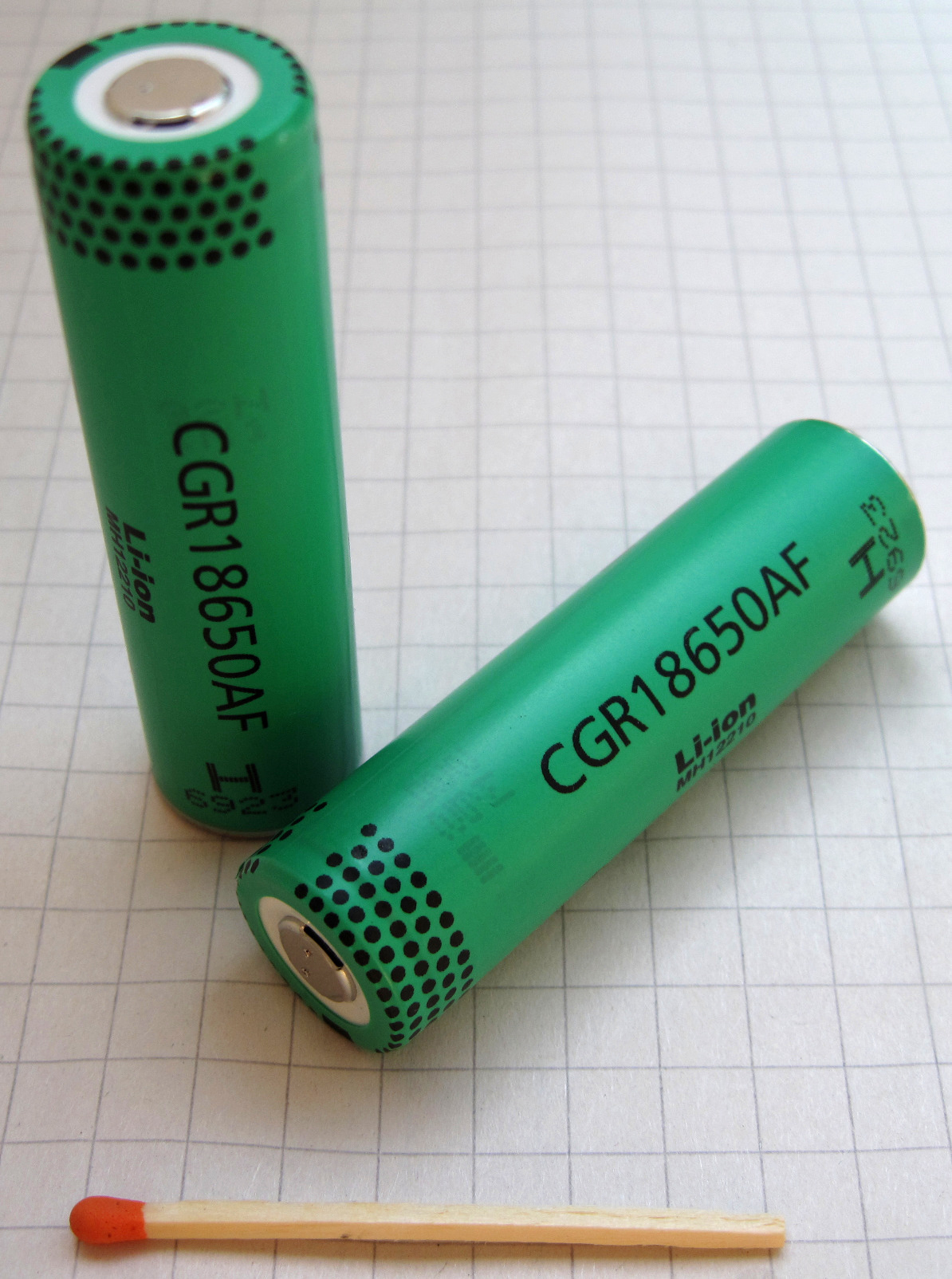
- A pair of Lithium-Ion rechargeable 18650 size cells with a matchstick for comparison.
- Component type: Power source
- Working principle: Electrochemical reactions, Electromotive force
- First produced: 1994
- Pin names: Anode and Cathode

Electronic symbol

An 18650 battery or 1865 cell is a cylindrical battery size (often lithium-ion battery or sodium ion battery) common in electronic devices. The batteries measure 18 mm (0.71 in) in diameter by 65.0 mm (2.56 in) in length, giving them the name 18650. The battery comes in many nominal voltages depending on the specific chemistry used.

Sony developed the 18650 in 1991, though Panasonic claims to have done so in 1994. They are commonly used in power tools, electric bicycles, laptops, and electric vehicles.

== Chemistry ==
The 18650 designation refers only to the physical dimensions of the cell and does not specify its electrochemistry. Most 18650 cells are lithium-ion batteries and have been manufactured using several cathode chemistries, including lithium cobalt oxide (LCO), manganese dioxide (LMO Lithium ion manganese oxide battery), lithium nickel manganese cobalt oxide (NMC), lithium nickel cobalt aluminum oxide (NCA), and lithium iron phosphate (LFP Lithium iron phosphate battery). Different chemistries offer trade-offs between energy density, power output, cycle life, cost, and thermal stability.

NCA and NMC chemistries have been widely used in high-energy applications such as electric vehicles and power tools, while LFP cells are valued for their long cycle life and improved thermal stability.

By the early 2020s, manufacturers had also introduced sodium-ion cells in the 18650 form factor. In 2024, a potassium-ion battery in the 18650 format was announced, demonstrating that the form factor can accommodate emerging battery chemistries in addition to lithium-ion technologies.

== Packs ==
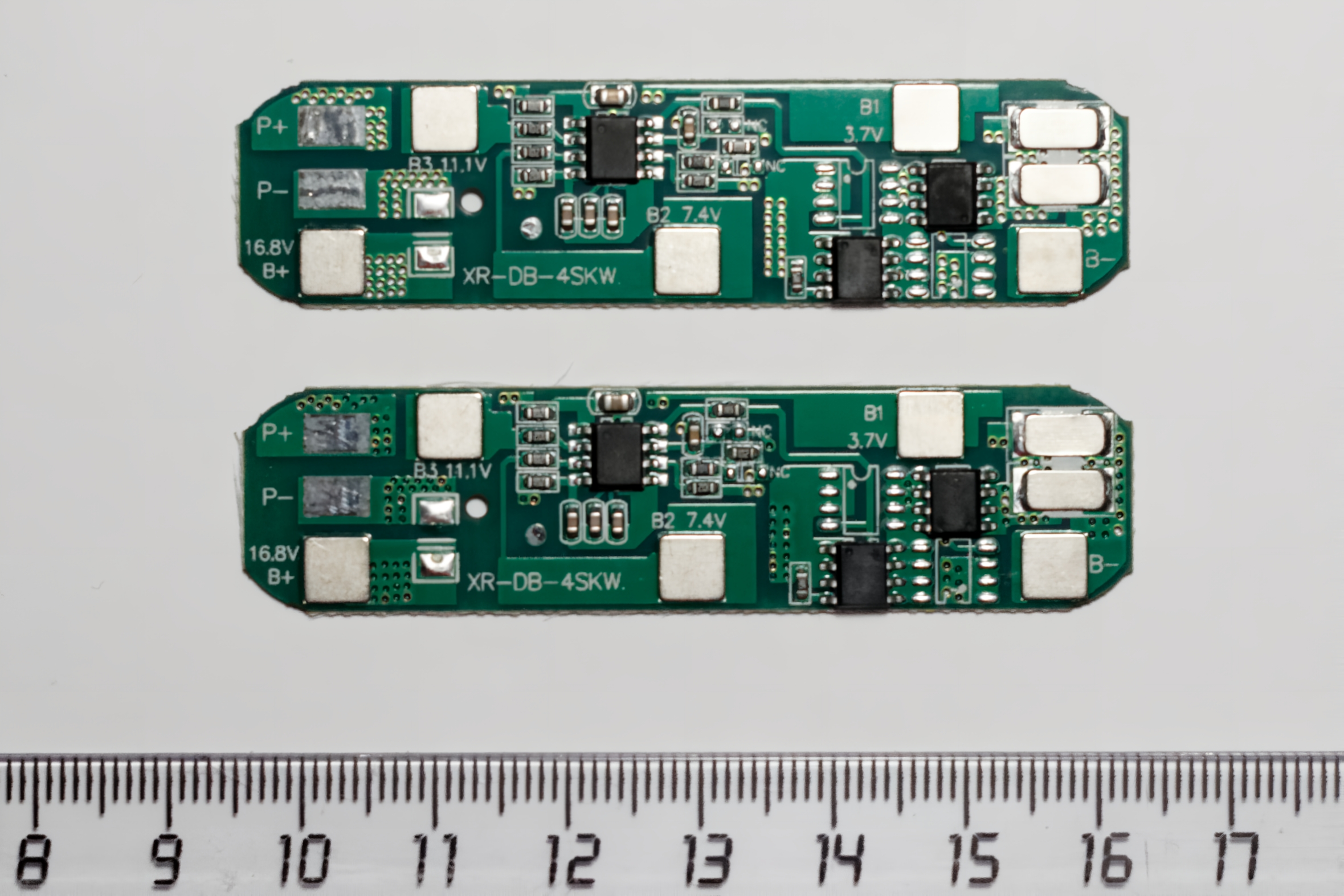
A generic BMS for lithium-ion 4 cells ('4s BMS')

18650 batteries are commonly used in packs, where a battery management system (BMS) is required, especially once cells age and perform differently. BMS boards balance the voltage of cells in series and protect against over- and under-discharge.

== Products using 18650 cells ==
18650 battery cells are used in a wide variety of products from the 1990s through the 2020s, and are widely regarded as the most produced lithium-ion cell size. 18650 cells are used in many laptop computer batteries, cordless power tools, many electric cars, electric scooters, most e-bikes, older portable powerbanks, electronic cigarettes, portable fans, and LED flashlights. Nominal voltage is 3.6–3.7 V.

In the electric vehicle sector, they are used in three vehicles manufactured by Tesla: the first-generation Roadster (2008-2012), Model S (2012-2026), and the Model X (2015-2026).

== See also ==
- List of battery sizes
