= Dosimeter =

Device measuring ionizing radiation exposure

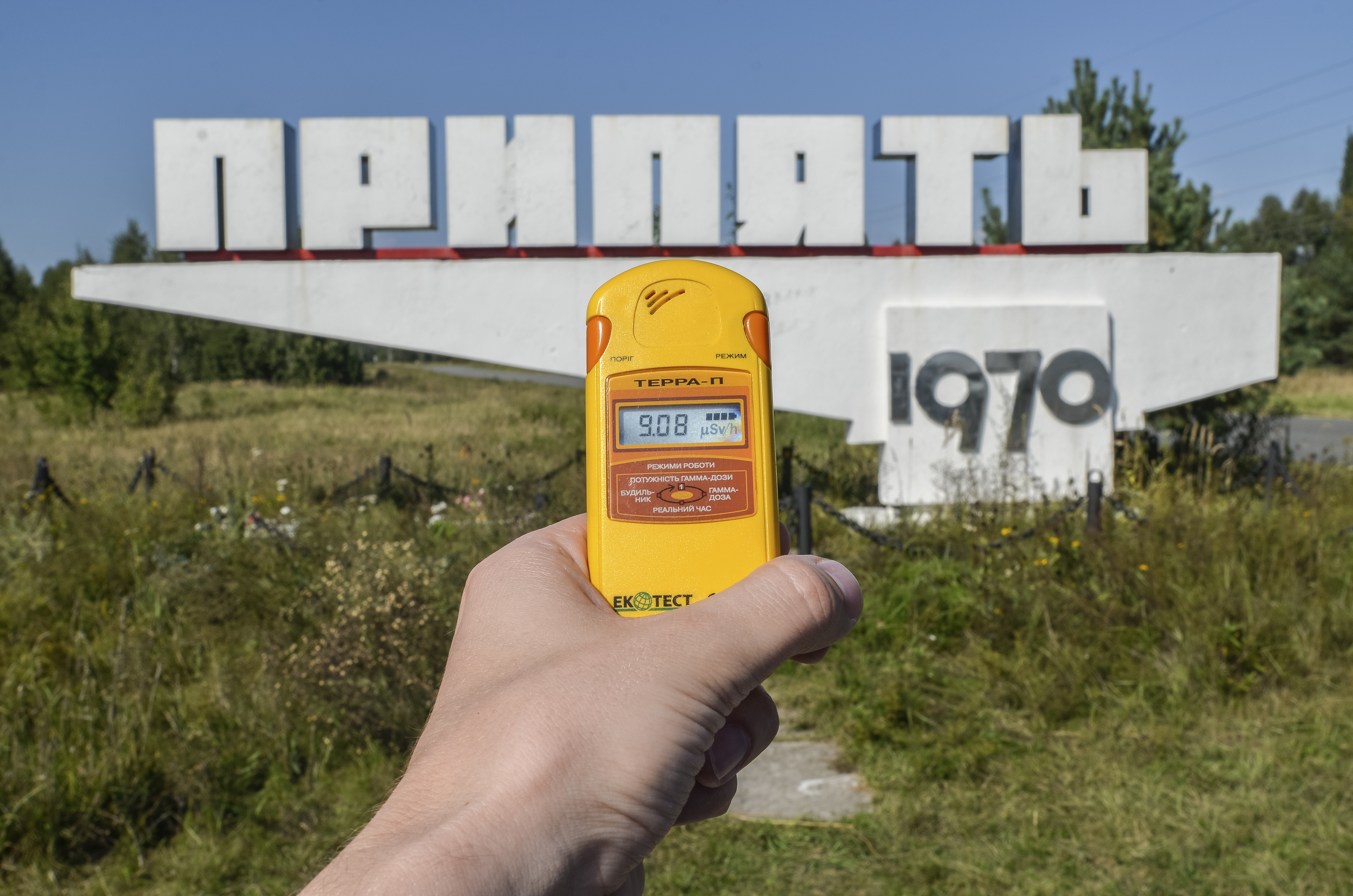
Radiation dosimeter in Pripyat

A radiation dosimeter is a device that measures the dose uptake of external ionizing radiation. It is worn by the person being monitored when used as a personal dosimeter, and is a record of the radiation dose received. Modern electronic personal dosimeters can give a continuous readout of cumulative dose and current dose rate, and can warn the wearer with an audible alarm when a specified dose rate or a cumulative dose is exceeded. Other dosimeters, such as thermoluminescent or film types, require processing after use to reveal the cumulative dose received, and cannot give a current indication of dose while being worn.

== Personal dosimeters ==
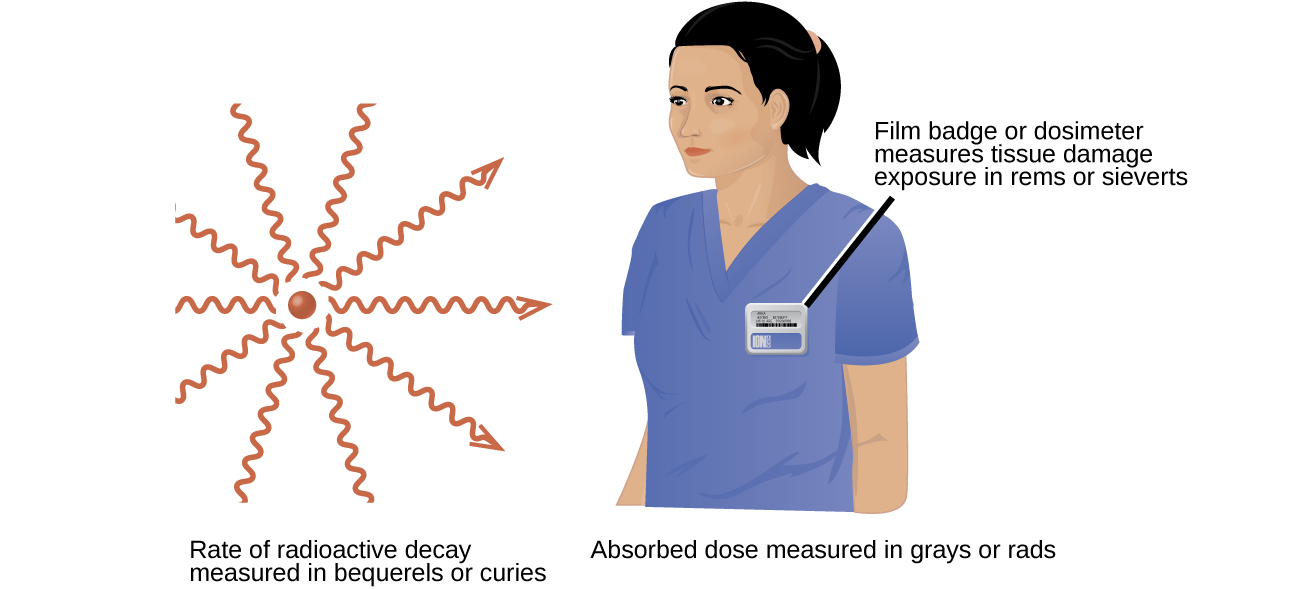
Example of "whole body" dosimeter positioning

The personal ionising radiation dosimeter is of fundamental importance in the disciplines of radiation dosimetry and radiation health physics and is primarily used to estimate the radiation dose deposited in an individual wearing the device.

Ionising radiation damage to the human body is cumulative and related to the total dose received, for which the SI unit is the sievert. Radiographers, nuclear power plant workers, doctors using radiotherapy, HAZMAT workers, and other people in situations that involve handling radionuclides are often required to wear dosimeters so a record of occupational exposure can be made. Such devices are known as "legal dosimeters" if they have been approved for use in recording personnel doses for regulatory purposes.

Dosimeters are typically worn on the outside of clothing, a "whole body" dosimeter is worn on the chest or torso to represent dose to the whole body. This location monitors exposure of most vital organs and represents the bulk of body mass. Additional dosimeters can be worn to assess dose to extremities or in radiation fields that vary considerably depending on orientation of the body to the source.

=== Electronic personal dosimeters ===
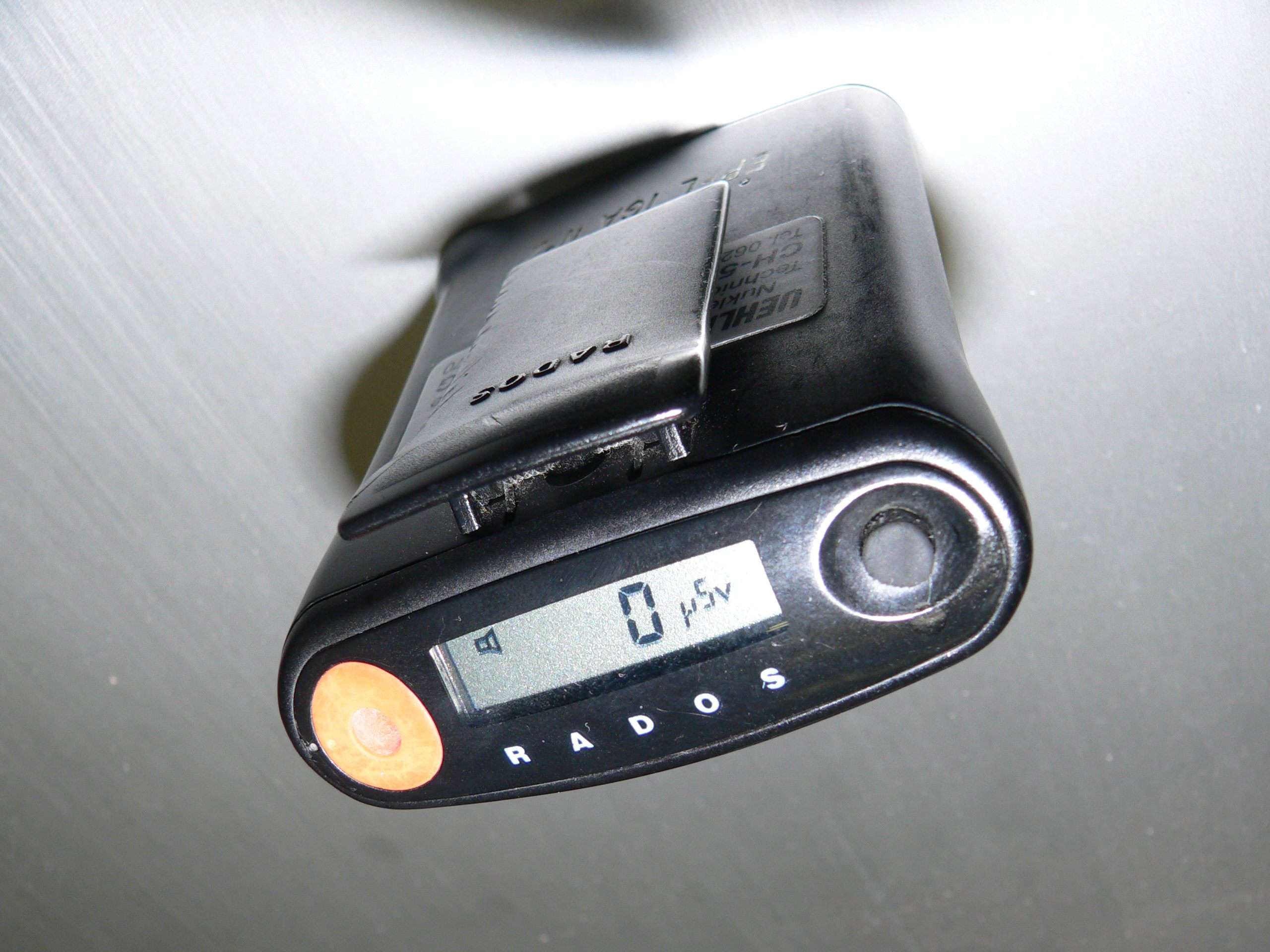
View of readout on an electronic personal dosimeter. The clip is used to attach it to the wearer's clothing.

The electronic personal dosimeter, the most commonly used type, is an electronic device that has a number of sophisticated functions, such as continual monitoring which allows alarm warnings at preset levels and live readout of dose accumulated. These are especially useful in high dose areas where residence time of the wearer is limited due to dose constraints. The dosimeter can be reset, usually after taking a reading for record purposes, and thereby re-used multiple times.

==== MOSFET dosimeter ====
Metal–oxide–semiconductor field-effect transistor dosimeters are now used as clinical dosimeters for radiotherapy radiation beams. The main advantages of MOSFET devices are:

1. The MOSFET dosimeter is direct reading with a very thin active area (less than 2μm).

2. The physical size of the MOSFET when packaged is less than 4 mm.

3. The post radiation signal is permanently stored and is dose rate independent.

Gate oxide of MOSFET which is conventionally silicon dioxide is an active sensing material in MOSFET dosimeters. Radiation creates defects (acts like electron-hole pairs) in oxide, which in turn affects the threshold voltage of the MOSFET. This change in threshold voltage is proportional to radiation dose. Alternate high-k gate dielectrics like hafnium dioxide and aluminum oxides are also proposed as a radiation dosimeters.

==== PIN dosimeters ====
PIN diodes are often used by military personnel for measuring radiation dosage.

==== Scintillation counter ====
A scintillation counter detects ionizing radiation by measuring the light emitted from a scintillator, giving a measurement of radiation levels almost instantly. Like thermoluminescent crystals, scintillation materials begin to glow when exposed to radiation. Unlike thermoluminescent crystals, which store absorbed radiation to measure accumulated doses over a period of time, scintillation materials release light immediately, and do not need to be heated.

==== Thermoluminescent dosimeter ====
A thermoluminescent dosimeter measures ionizing radiation exposure by measuring the intensity of light emitted from a Dy or B doped crystal in the detector when heated. The intensity of light emitted is dependent upon the radiation exposure. These were once sold surplus and one format once used by submariners and nuclear workers resembled a dark green wristwatch containing the active components and a highly sensitive IR wire ended diode mounted to the doped LiF2 glass chip that when the assembly is precisely heated (hence thermoluminescent) emits the stored radiation as narrow band infrared light until it is depleted The main advantage is that the chip records dosage passively until exposed to light or heat so even a used sample kept in darkness can provide valuable scientific data.

=== Legacy types of dosimeters ===
==== Film badge dosimeter ====
Film badge dosimeters are for one-time use only. The level of radiation absorption is indicated by a change to the film emulsion, which is shown when the film is developed. They are now mostly superseded by electronic personal dosimeters and thermoluminescent dosimeters.

==== Quartz fiber dosimeter ====
These use the property of a quartz fiber to measure the static electricity held on the fiber. Before use by the wearer a dosimeter is charged to a high voltage, causing the fiber to deflect due to electrostatic repulsion. As the gas in the dosimeter chamber becomes ionized by radiation the charge leaks away, causing the fiber to straighten and thereby indicate the amount of dose received against a graduated scale, which is viewed by a small in-built microscope. They are only used for short durations, such as a day or a shift, as they can suffer from charge leakage, which gives a false high reading. However they are immune to EMP so were used during the Cold War as a failsafe method of determining radiation exposure.

They are now largely superseded by electronic personal dosimeters for short term monitoring.

==== Geiger tube dosimeter ====
These use a conventional Geiger–Müller tube, typically a ZP1301 or similar energy-compensated tube, requiring between 600 and 700V and pulse detection components. The display on most is a bubble or miniature LCD type with 4 digits and a discrete counter integrated chip such as 74C925/6. LED units usually have a button to turn the display on and off for longer battery life, and an infrared emitter for count verification and calibration. The voltage is derived from a separate pinned or wire-ended module that often uses a unijunction transistor driving a small step-up coil and multiplier stage. While expensive, it is reliable over time and especially in high-radiation environments, sharing this trait with tunnel diodes, though the encapsulants, inductors and capacitors have been known to break down internally over time. These have the disadvantage that the stored dose in becquerels or microsieverts is volatile and vanishes if the power supply is disconnected, though there can be a low-leakage capacitor to preserve the memory for short periods without a battery. Because of this, most units use long-life batteries and high-quality contacts. Recently-designed units log dose over time to non-volatile memory, such as a 24C256 chip so it may be read out via a serial port.

== Dosimetry dose quantities ==
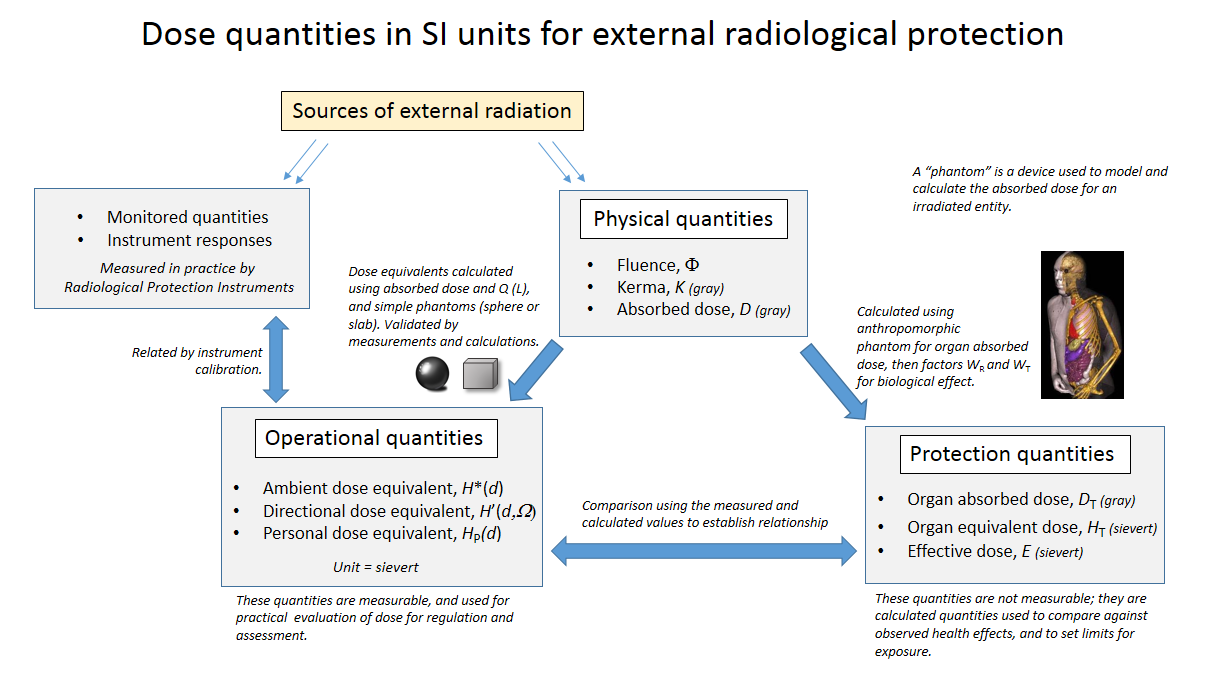
External radiation dose quantities used in radiological protection, based on International Commission on Radiation Units and Measurements report 57

The operational quantity for personal dosimetry is the personal dose equivalent, which is defined by the International Commission on Radiological Protection as the dose equivalent in soft tissue at an appropriate depth, below a specified point on the human body. The specified point is usually given by the position where the individual’s dosimeter is worn.

=== Instrument and dosimeter response ===
This is an actual reading obtained from such as an ambient dose gamma monitor, or a personal dosimeter. The dosimeter is calibrated in a known radiation field to ensure display of accurate operational quantities and allow a relationship to known health effect. The personal dose equivalent is used to assess dose uptake, and allow regulatory limits to be met. It is the figure usually entered into the records of external dose for occupational radiation workers.

The dosimeter plays an important role within the international radiation protection system developed by the International Commission on Radiological Protection and the International Commission on Radiation Units and Measurements. This is shown in the accompanying diagram.

==== Dosimeter calibration ====
The "slab" phantom is used to represent the human torso for calibration of whole body dosimeters. This replicates the radiation scattering and absorption effects of the human torso. The International Atomic Energy Agency states "The slab phantom is 300 mm × 300 mm × 150 mm depth to represent the human torso".

== Radiation related measurement quantities ==
Ionizing radiation related quantities
Quantity	Unit	Symbol	Derivation	Year	SI equivalent
Activity (A)	becquerel	Bq	s^{−1}	1974	SI unit
Activity (A)	curie	Ci	3.7×10^{10} s^{−1}	1953	3.7×10^{10} Bq
Activity (A)	rutherford	Rd	10^{6} s^{−1}	1946	1000000 Bq
Exposure (X)	coulomb per kilogram	C/kg	C⋅kg^{−1} of air	1974	SI unit
Exposure (X)	röntgen	R	esu / 0.001293 g of air	1928	2.58×10^{−4} C/kg
Absorbed dose (D)	gray	Gy	J⋅kg^{−1}	1974	SI unit
Absorbed dose (D)	erg per gram	erg/g	erg⋅g^{−1}	1950	1.0×10^{−4} Gy
Absorbed dose (D)	rad	rad	100 erg⋅g^{−1}	1953	0.010 Gy
Equivalent dose (H)	sievert	Sv	J⋅kg^{−1} × W_{R}	1977	SI unit
Equivalent dose (H)	röntgen equivalent man	rem	100 erg⋅g^{−1} × W_{R}	1971	0.010 Sv
Effective dose (E)	sievert	Sv	J⋅kg^{−1} × W_{R} × W_{T}	1977	SI unit
Effective dose (E)	röntgen equivalent man	rem	100 erg⋅g^{−1} × W_{R} × W_{T}	1971	0.010 Sv

== Process irradiation verification ==
Manufacturing processes that treat products with ionizing radiation, such as food irradiation, use dosimeters to calibrate doses deposited in the matter being irradiated. These usually must have a greater dose range than personal dosimeters, and doses are normally measured in the unit of absorbed dose: the gray (Gy). The dosimeter is located on or adjacent to the items being irradiated during the process as a validation of dose levels received.

== Dosimeters as a tracking device ==
A Soviet KGB spy "Raduga" (Rainbow) dosimeter, radiation tracking device was used by deliberately contaminating items such as money, artworks, documents, propaganda literature etc. with a nuclear radiation signature which can then be tracked using this device which would vibrate when in proximity to the radiation. The process was utilized as a way of catching thieves and corrupt officials and locating hidden stashes.

== Gallery ==
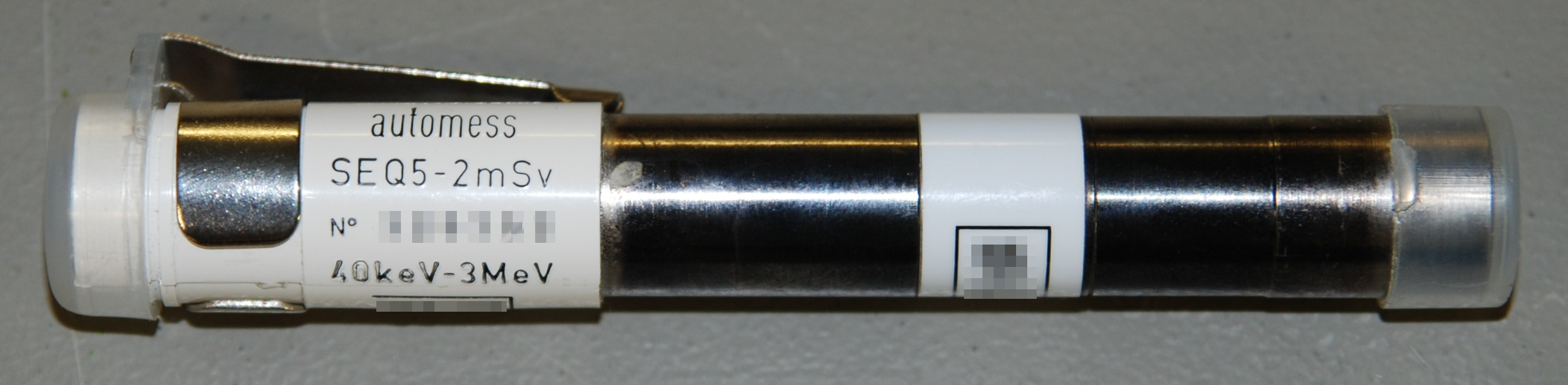
Quartz-fiber dosimeter – now largely superseded

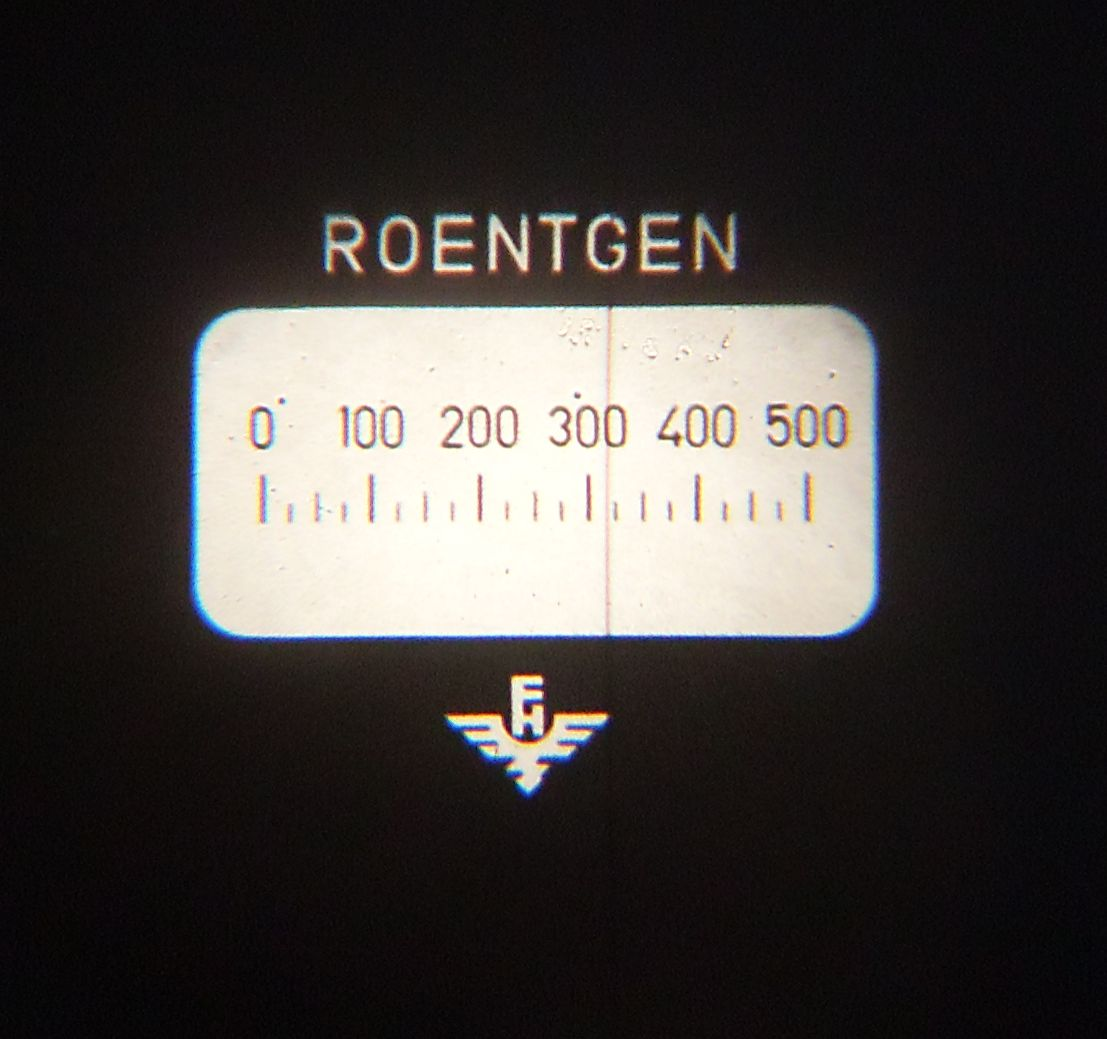
View of quartz fiber dosimeter reading

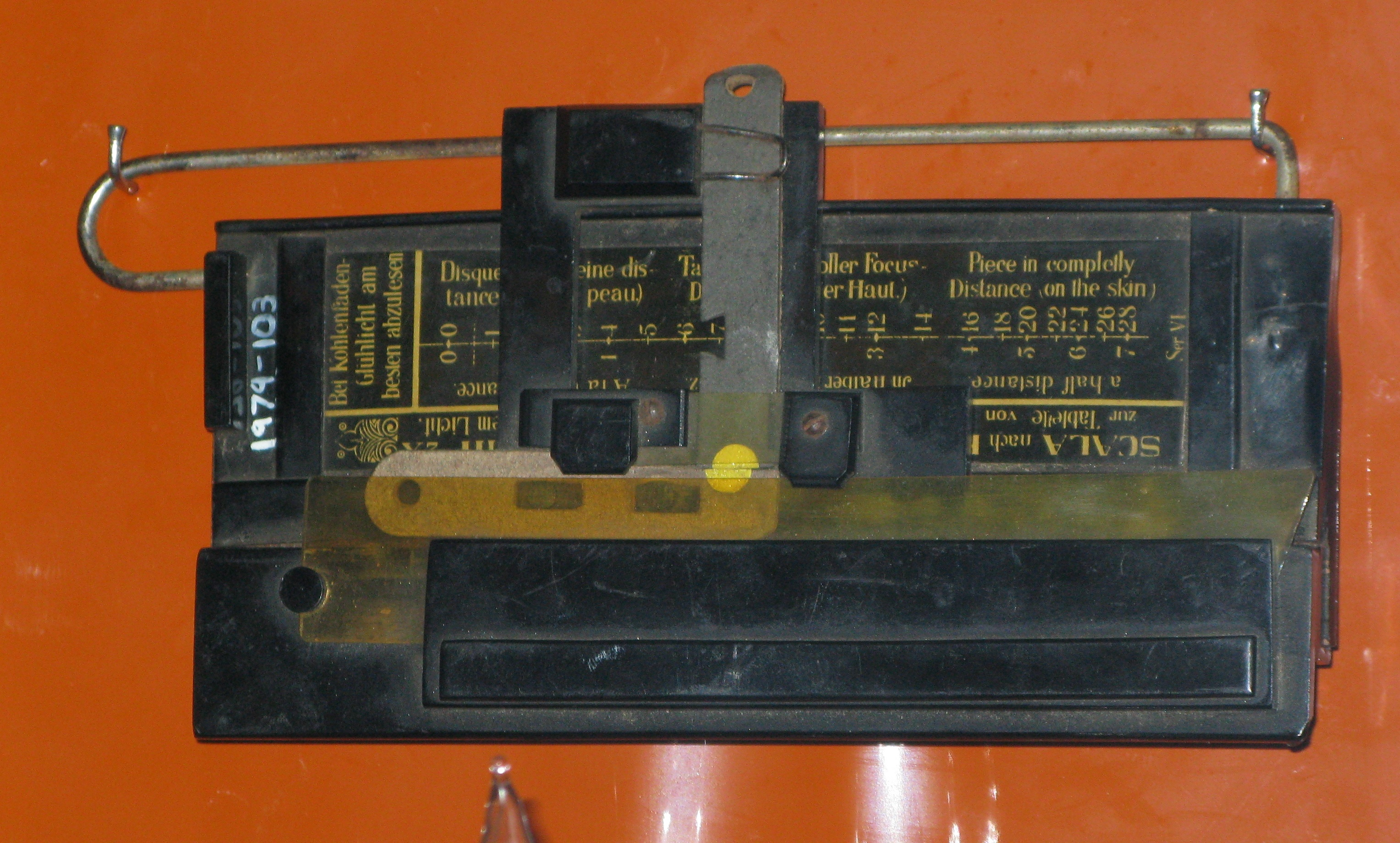
Chromoradiometer or colour dosimeter by Guido Holzknecht (1902)

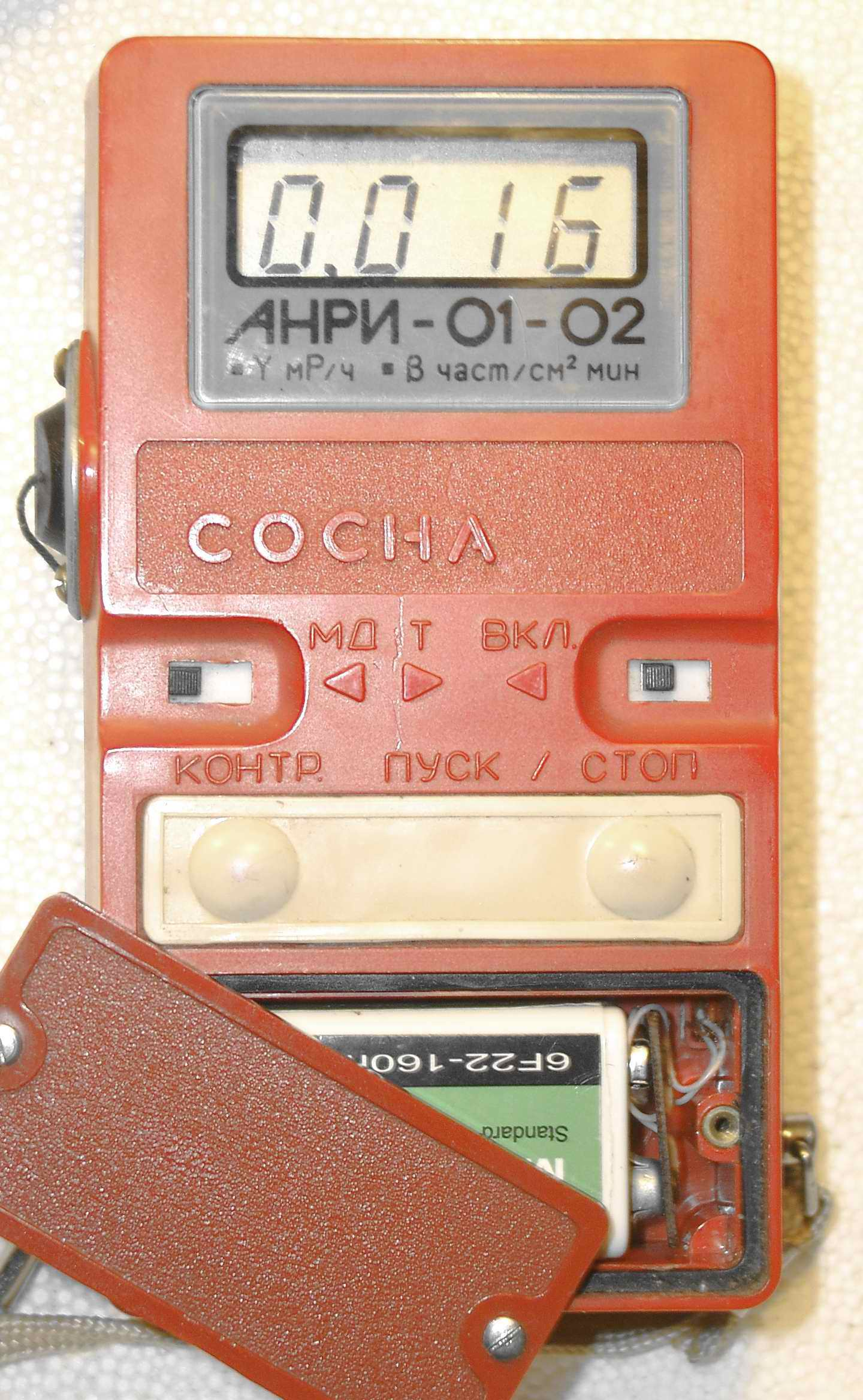
Russian Sosna radiometer-dosimeter (Front view),

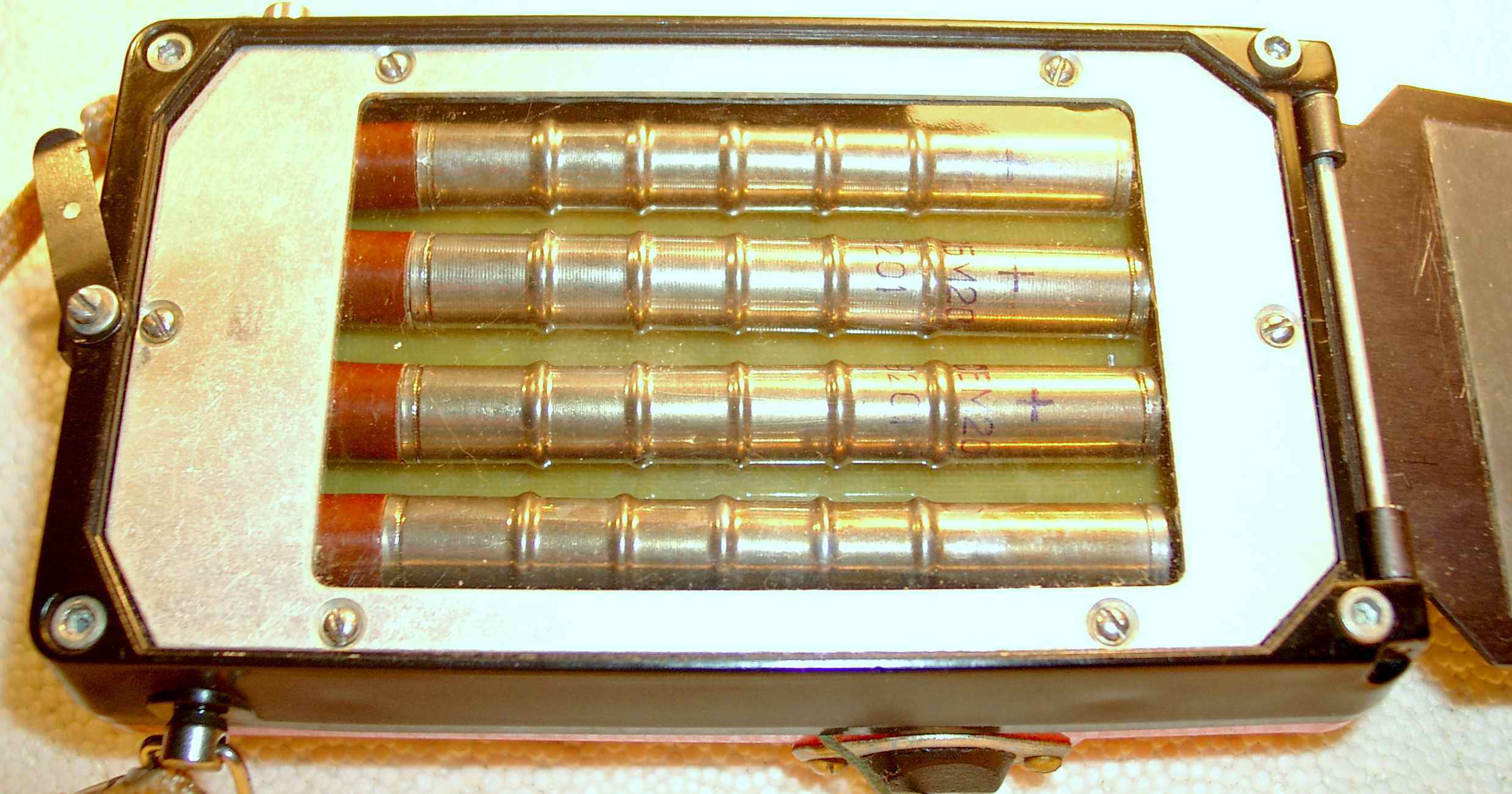
Russian Sosna radiometer-dosimeter (Rear view)

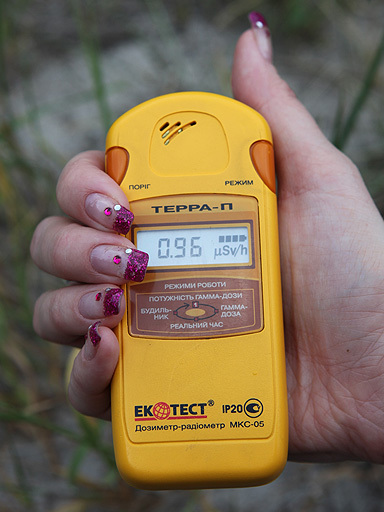
Ukrainian Terra-P dosimeter

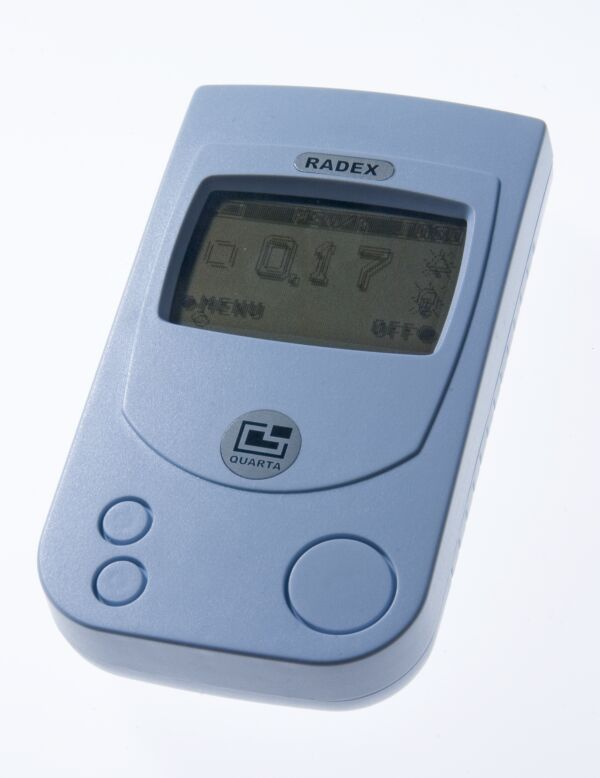
Russian Radex RD1503

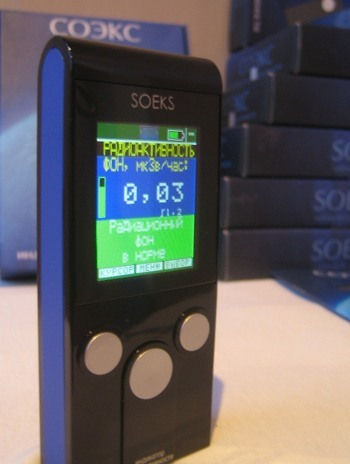
Soeks 01M

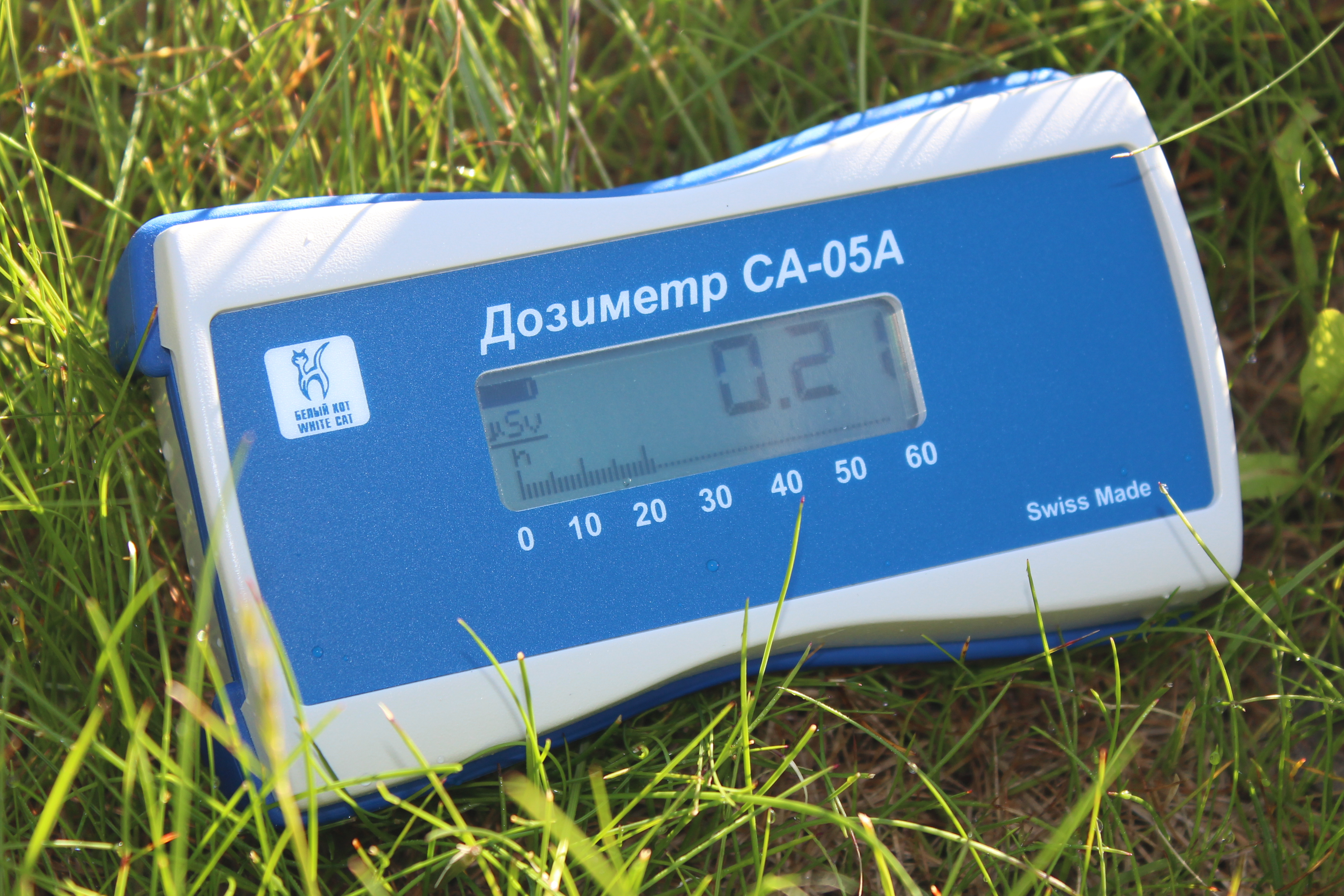
Swiss dosimeter SA-05A

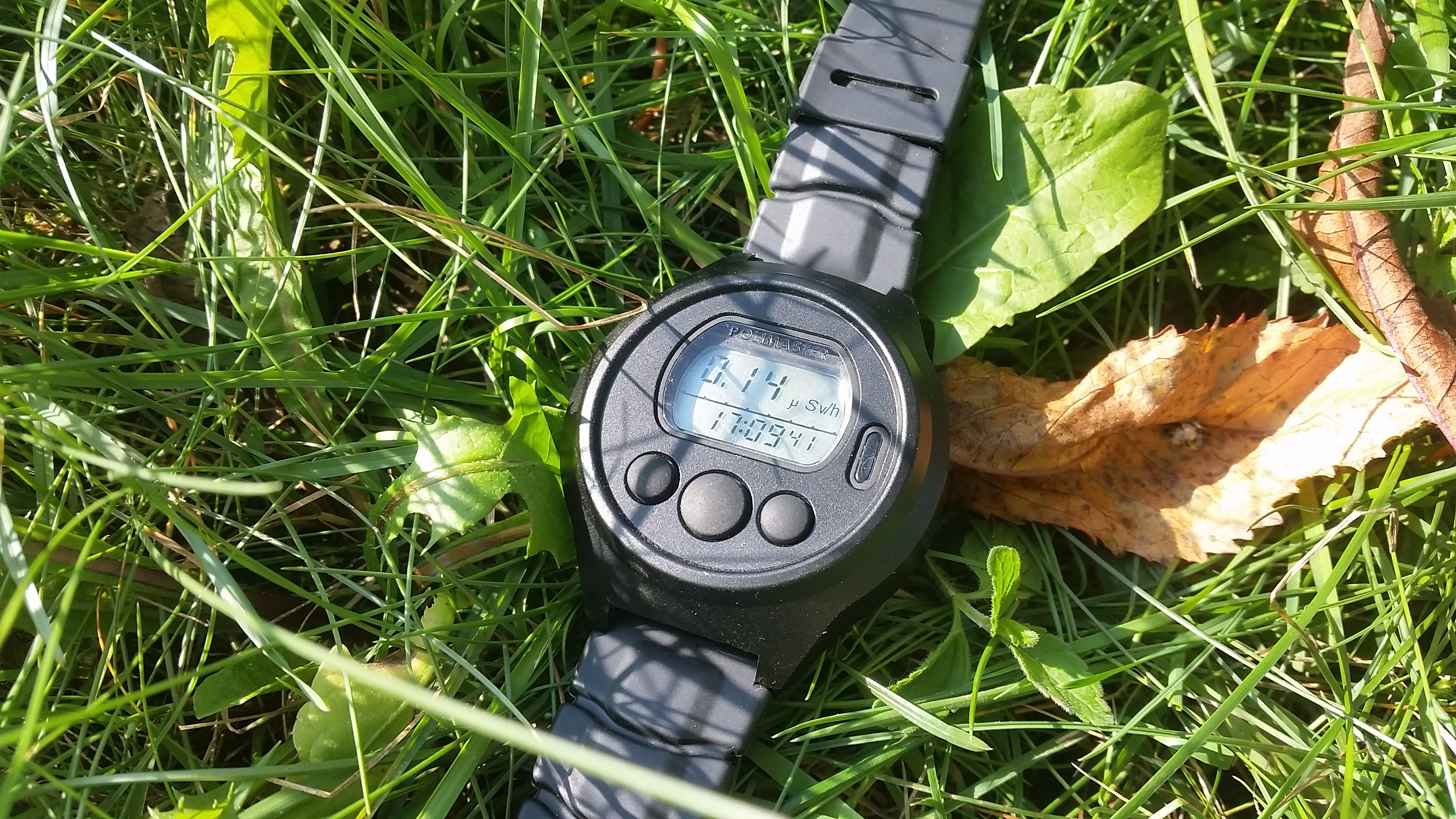
Polimaster PM1603B

== See also ==
- Comparison of dosimeters
- Geiger counter
- Ionisation chamber
- Operational instruments of the Royal Observer Corps
- Scintillation counter
