= Radium and radon in the environment =

Significant contributors to environmental radioactivity

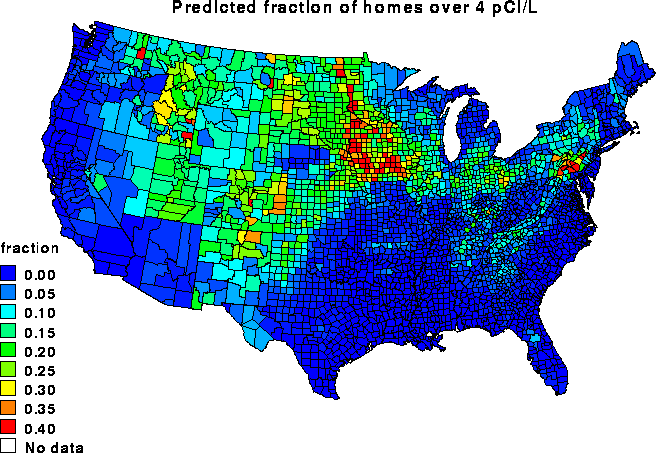
Predicted fraction of U.S. homes have radon concentrations exceeding the EPA's recommended action level of 4 pCi/L

Radium and radon are important contributors to environmental radioactivity. Radon occurs naturally as a result of decay of radioactive elements in soil and it can accumulate in houses built on areas where such decay occurs. Radon is a major cause of cancer; it is estimated to contribute to ~2% of all cancer related deaths in Europe.

Radium, like radon, is radioactive and is found in small quantities in nature and is hazardous to life if radiation exceeds 20-50 mSv/year. Radium is a decay product of uranium and thorium. Radium may also be released into the environment by human activity: for example, in improperly discarded products painted with radioluminescent paint.

== Radium ==
=== In the oil and gas industries ===
Residues from the oil and gas industry often contain radium and its daughters. The sulfate scale from an oil well can be very radium rich. The water inside an oil field is often very rich in strontium, barium and radium, while seawater is very rich in sulfate: so if water from an oil well is discharged into the sea or mixed with seawater, the radium is likely to be brought out of solution by the barium/strontium sulfate which acts as a carrier precipitate.

=== Radioluminescent (glow in the dark) products ===
It is not unknown for local contamination to arise from improper disposal of radium-based radioluminescent paints.

=== In radioactive quackery ===
Eben Byers was a wealthy American socialite whose death in 1932 from using a radioactive quackery product called Radithor is a prominent example of a death caused by radium. Radithor contained ~1 μCi (40 kBq) of ^{226}Ra and 1 μCi of ^{228}Ra per bottle. Radithor was taken by mouth and radium, being a calcium mimic, has a very long biological halflife in bone.

== Radon ==
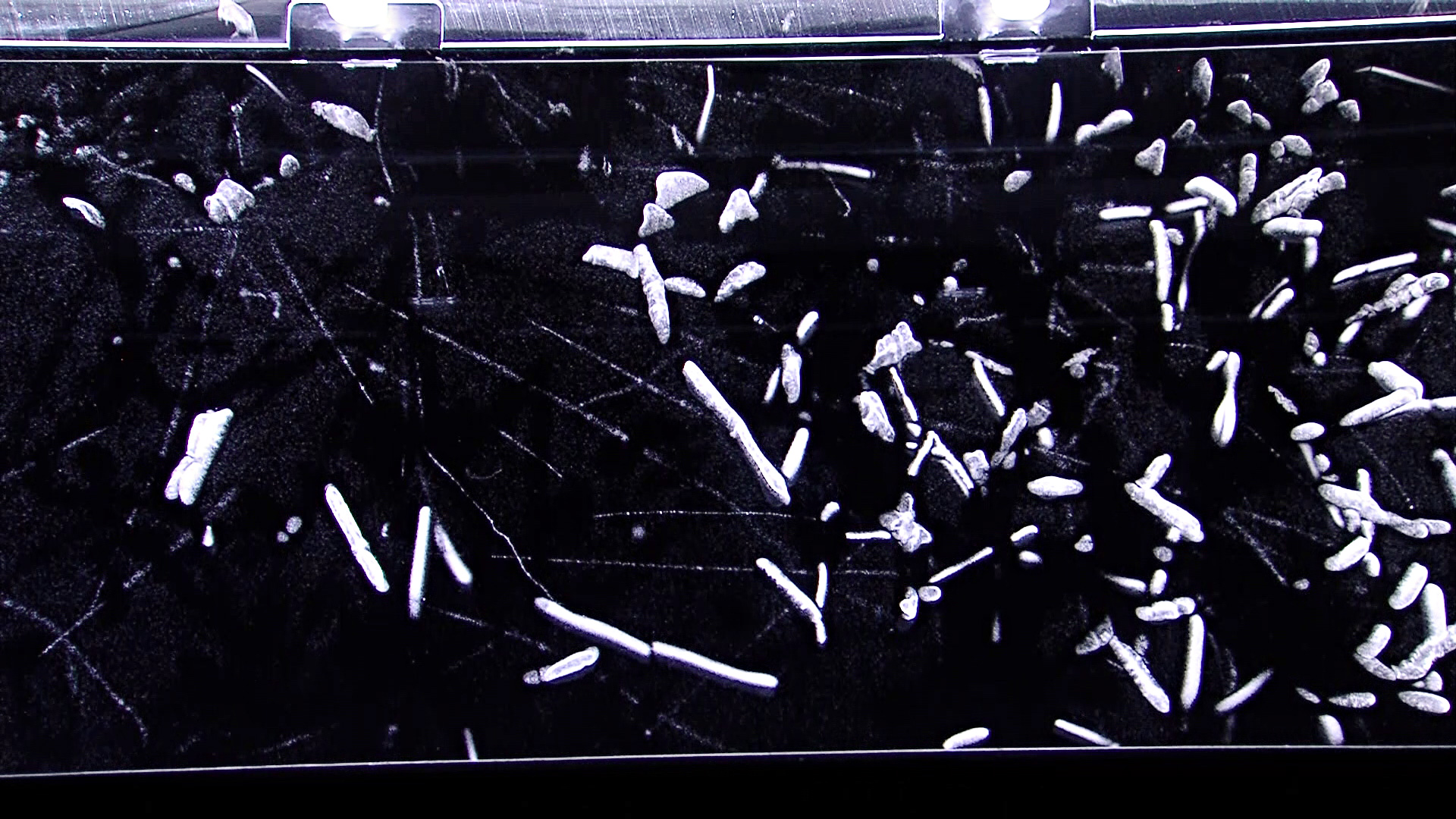
Radon in air forms a part of the background radiation, which can be observed in a cloud chamber

Most of the dose is due to the decay of the polonium (^{218}Po) and lead (^{214}Pb) daughters of ^{222}Rn. By controlling exposure to the daughters the radioactive dose to the skin and lungs can be reduced by at least 90%. This can be done by wearing a dust mask, and wearing a suit to cover the entire body. Note that exposure to smoke at the same time as radon and radon daughters will increase the harmful effect of the radon. In uranium miners radon has been found to be more carcinogenic in smokers than in non-smokers.

The radium or uranium series.

=== Occurrence ===
Radon concentration in open air varies between 1 and 100 Bq m^{−3}. Radon can be found in some spring waters and hot springs. The towns of Misasa, Japan, and Bad Kreuznach, Germany boast radium-rich springs which emit radon, as does Radium Springs, New Mexico.

Radon exhausts naturally from the ground, particularly in certain regions, especially but not only regions with granitic soils. However, not all granitic regions are prone to high emissions of radon. For instance, while the rock which Aberdeen is on is very radium rich, the rock lacks the cracks required for the radon to migrate. In other nearby areas of Scotland (to the north of Aberdeen) and in Cornwall/Devon the radon is very much able to leave the rock.

Radon is a decay product of radium which in turn is a decay product of uranium. Maps of average radon levels in houses are available, to assist in planning mitigation measures.

While high uranium in the soil/rock under a house does not always lead to a high radon level in air, a positive correlation between the uranium content of the soil and the radon level in air can be seen.

=== In air ===
Radon harms indoor air quality in many homes. (See "In houses" below.)

Radon (^{222}Rn) released into the air decays to ^{210}Pb and other radioisotopes and the levels of ^{210}Pb can be measured. The rate of deposition of this radioisotope is very dependent on the season. Here is a graph of the deposition rate observed in Japan.

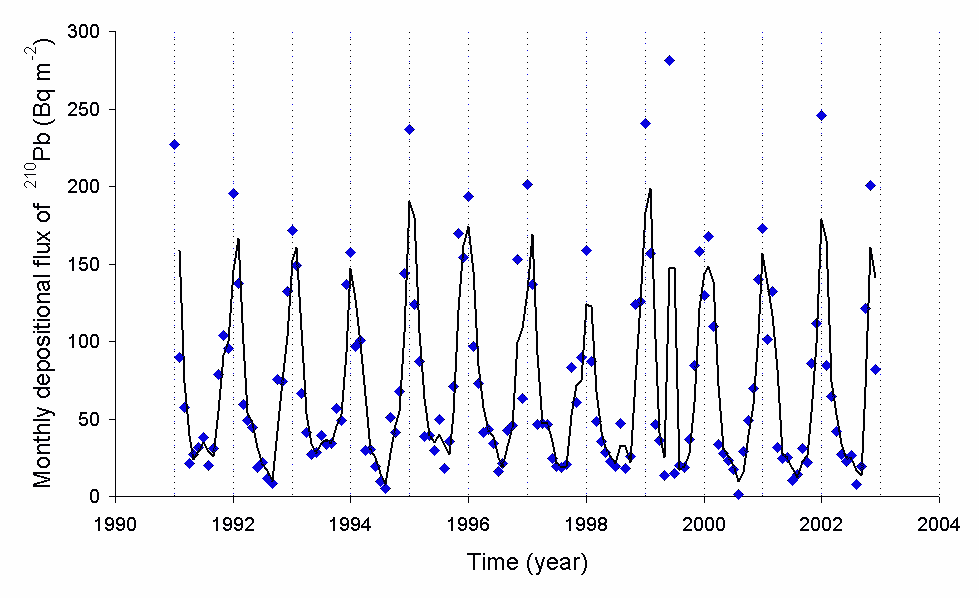
Lead-210 deposition rate as a function of time as observed in Japan

=== In groundwater ===
Well water can be very rich in radon; the use of this water inside a house is another route allowing radon to enter the house. The radon can enter the air and then be a source of exposure to the humans, or the water can be consumed by humans which is a different exposure route.

=== Radon in rainwater ===
Rainwater can be highly radioactive due to high levels of radon and its decay progenies ^{214}Bi and ^{214}Pb; the concentrations of these radioisotopes can be high enough to seriously disrupt radiation monitoring at nuclear power plants. The highest levels of radon in rainwater occur during thunderstorms, and it is hypothesized that radon is concentrated in thunderstorms because it forms some positive ions during thunderstorms. Estimates of the age of raindrops have been obtained from measuring the isotopic abundance of radon's short-lived decay progeny in rainwater.

=== In the oil and gas industries ===
Water, oil and gas from a well often contain radon. The radon decays to form solid radioisotopes which form coatings on the inside of pipework. In an oil processing plant the area of the plant where propane is processed is often one of the more contaminated areas of the plant as radon has a similar boiling point to propane.

=== In mines ===
Because uranium minerals emit radon gas, and their harmful and highly radioactive decay products, uranium mining is considerably more dangerous than other (already dangerous) hard rock mining, requiring adequate ventilation systems if the mines are not open pit. In the 1950s, a significant number of American uranium miners were Navajo, as many uranium deposits were discovered on Navajo reservations. A statistically significant proportion of these miners later developed small-cell lung cancer, a type of cancer usually not associated with smoking, after exposure to uranium ore and radon-222, a natural decay product of uranium. The cancer causing agent has been shown to be the radon which is produced by the uranium, and not the uranium itself. Some survivors and their descendants received compensation under the Radiation Exposure Compensation Act in 1990.

The level of radon in the air of mines is now normally controlled by law. In a working mine, the radon level can be controlled by ventilation, sealing off old workings and controlling the water in the mine. The level in a mine can go up when a mine is abandoned; it can reach a level which can cause the skin to become red (a mild radiation burn). The radon levels in some of the mines can reach 400 to 700 kBq m^{−3}.

A common unit of exposure of lung tissue to alpha emitters is the working level month (WLM), this is where the human lungs have been exposed for 170 hours (a typical month worth of work for a miner) to air which has 3.7 kBq of ^{222}Rn (in equilibrium with its decay products). This is air which has the alpha dose rate of 1 working level (WL). It is estimated that the average person (general public) is subject to 0.2 WLM per year, which works out at about 15 to 20 WLM in a lifetime. According to the NRC, 1 WLM is a 5 to 10 mSv lung dose (0.5 to 1.0 rem), while the Organisation for Economic Co-operation and Development (OECD) consider that 1 WLM is equal to a lung dose of 5.5 mSv, and the International Commission on Radiological Protection (ICRP) consider 1 WLM to be a 5 mSv lung dose for professional workers (and a 4 mSv lung dose for the general public). Lastly the United Nations Scientific Committee on the Effects of Atomic Radiation (UNSCEAR) consider that the exposure of the lungs to 1 Bq of ^{222}Rn (in equilibrium with its decay products) for one year will cause a dose of 61 μSv.

In humans a relationship between lung cancer and radon has been shown to exist (beyond all reasonable doubt) for exposures of 100 WLM and above. By using the data from several studies it has been possible to show that an increased risk can be caused by a dose as low as 15 to 20 WLM. Sadly these studies have been difficult as the random errors in the data are very large. It is likely that the miners are also subject to other effects which can harm their lungs while at work (for example dust and diesel fumes).

=== In houses ===
It has been known since at least the 1950s that radon is present in indoor air, and research into its effects on human health started in the early 1970s. The danger of radon exposure in dwellings received more widespread public awareness after 1984, as a result of the case of Stanley Watras, an employee at the Limerick nuclear power plant in Pennsylvania. Mr. Watras set off the radiation alarms (see Geiger counter) on his way into work for two weeks straight while authorities searched for the source of the contamination. They were shocked to find that the source was astonishingly high levels of radon in his basement and it was not related to the nuclear plant. The risks associated with living in his house were estimated to be equivalent to smoking 135 packs of cigarettes every day.

Depending how houses are built and ventilated, radon may accumulate in basements and dwellings. The European Union recommends that mitigation should be taken starting from concentrations of 400 Bq/m^{3} for old houses, and 200 Bq/m^{3} for new ones.

The National Council on Radiation Protection and Measurements (NCRP) recommends action for any house with a concentration higher than 8 pCi/L (300 Bq/m^{3}).

The United States Environmental Protection Agency recommends action for any house with a concentration higher than 148 Bq/m^{3} (given as 4 pCi/L). Nearly one in 15 homes in the U.S. has a high level of indoor radon according to their statistics. The U.S. Surgeon General and EPA recommend all homes be tested for radon. Since 1985, millions of homes have been tested for radon in the U.S.

By adding a crawl space under the ground floor, which is subject to forced ventilation, the radon level in the house can be lowered.
