= Zsolt Radák =

Hungarian exercise physiologist and professor

- Born: 1961 (age 64–65); Nagykanizsa, Hungary
- Education: Hungarian University of Physical Education (BSc, MSc, Dr. Univ); University of Tsukuba (PhD); Hungarian Academy of Sciences (DSc)
- Known for: Hormesis in exercise, Oxidative stress research, DNAmFitAge clock, Lactate signaling
- Awards: Széchenyi Professorship, Bolyai Research Fellowship
- Scientific career
- Fields: Exercise physiology, Biochemistry, Gerontology
- Institutions: Hungarian University of Sports Science

Zsolt Radák (born 1961) is a Hungarian exercise physiologist, academic, and researcher. He currently serves as the Vice-Rector for Innovation and Science at the Hungarian University of Sports Science (HUSS) and is the Director of the Research Institute of Sport Science. Radák is recognized for his research on the molecular mechanisms of physical exercise, specifically the role of oxidative stress, hormesis, and epigenetics in biological aging and brain function. He is frequently cited among the top 2% of the world's scientists in rankings compiled by Stanford University and Elsevier.

== Early life and education ==
Radák was born in Nagykanizsa in 1961. He attended the Hungarian University of Physical Education (now the Hungarian University of Sports Science), where he completed his undergraduate and graduate studies, earning a Bachelor of Science (BSc) and a Master of Science (MSc) in 1985. He continued his studies at the same institution to earn a University Doctorate (Dr. Univ) in 1990.

Radák subsequently pursued advanced doctoral research in Japan, receiving a PhD from the University of Tsukuba in 1996. In 2003, he was awarded the Doctor of Science (DSc) by the Hungarian Academy of Sciences for his specialized research in medical science and the biochemistry of physical training.

== Career ==
Radák's professional career includes roles in elite sports coaching and academic administration. He formerly served as a national coach for the Hungarian Track and Field National Team.

He spent over 14 years at Semmelweis University in Budapest, where he held the positions of Dean and Associate-Dean of the Faculty of Physical Education and Sport Science. Since 2014, he has led the Research Institute of Sport Science at HUSS.

Throughout his career, he has held numerous visiting professorships at international institutions, including the University of Texas (United States), Waseda University (Japan), Juntendo University, Toho University, and Beijing Sport University (China).

== Research ==
Radák's research focuses on the molecular adaptation of the human body to physical training.

=== Oxidative stress and Hormesis ===
Radák was among the first researchers to demonstrate that the reactive oxygen species (ROS) produced during exercise serve as essential signaling molecules rather than merely harmful byproducts. This research supports the concept of hormesis in exercise, where low-level oxidative stress triggers cellular repair and increases biological resilience.

=== DNAmFitAge and Epigenetics ===
His research group developed the DNAmFitAge clock, an epigenetic biomarker that utilizes DNA methylation patterns to measure biological age. This study provides a metric for how physical fitness can influence the rate of biological aging. In 2025, his team published findings in Biogerontology linking the protein cargo of extracellular vesicles to the DNAmFitAge clock.

=== Lactate as a signaling molecule ===
In 2025, Radák's team published research in the journal Redox Biology regarding the role of lactic acid (lactate) in cellular signaling. The study demonstrated that lactate acts as a metabolic-epigenetic signal that can alter DNA methylation and gene expression, providing a molecular explanation for the efficacy of high-intensity interval training (HIIT) and its potential role in suppressing tumor growth.

=== Neuroprotection ===
Radák has published extensively on the neuroprotective effects of exercise. His work suggests that regular physical activity increases the expression of brain-derived neurotrophic factor (BDNF) and enhances DNA repair in the brain, potentially delaying age-related cognitive decline.

== Bibliography ==
- Free Radicals in Exercise and Aging (Human Kinetics, 2000)
- Exercise and Diseases (Meyer & Meyer, 2005)
- Physiology of Physical Training (Academic Press, 2018)

== Awards and honors ==
- Széchenyi Professorship (Hungarian Academy of Sciences)
- Bolyai Research Fellowship
- Gold Medal of the Hungarian Society of Sport Science
