= Dose-Response =

- Discipline: Pharmacology, toxicology, radiobiology, biophysics
- Language: English
- Edited by: Edward Calabrese

Publication details
- Former names: Nonlinearity in Biology, Toxicology and Medicine
- History: 2003–present
- Publisher: SAGE Publications
- Frequency: Quarterly
- Impact factor: 1.855 (2015)

Standard abbreviations
- ISO 4: Dose-Response

Indexing
- ISSN: 1559-3258
- OCLC no.: 62735229

Links
- Journal homepage; Online access; Online archive

Dose-Response is a quarterly peer-reviewed scientific journal covering research on the dose–response relationship, especially hormesis. It was established in 2003 as Nonlinearity in Biology, Toxicology and Medicine, obtaining its current name in 2005. It is published by SAGE Publications on behalf of the International Dose-Response Society, of which it is the official journal. Since its founding, the journal's editor-in-chief has been Edward Calabrese (University of Massachusetts). According to the Journal Citation Reports, the journal has a 2015 impact factor of 1.855, ranking it 162nd out of 255 journals in the category "Pharmacology & Pharmacy" and 62nd out of 124 in the category "Radiology, Nuclear Medicine & Medical Imaging."
