= Radon mitigation =

Reducing radon gas levels in buildings

Radon mitigation is any process used to reduce radon gas concentrations in the breathing zones of occupied buildings, or radon from water supplies. Radon is a significant contributor to environmental radioactivity and indoor air pollution. Exposure to radon can cause serious health problems such as lung cancer.

Mitigation of radon in the air by active soil depressurization is most effective. Concrete slabs, sub-floors, and/or crawlspaces are sealed, an air pathway is then created to exhaust radon above the roof-line, and a radon mitigation fan is installed to run permanently. In particularly troublesome dwellings, air exchangers can be used to reduce indoor radon concentrations. Treatment systems using aeration or activated charcoal are available to remove radon from domestic water supplies. There is no proven link between radon in water and gastrointestinal cancers; however, extremely high radon concentrations in water can be aerosolized by faucets and shower heads and contribute to high indoor radon levels in the air.

== Testing ==
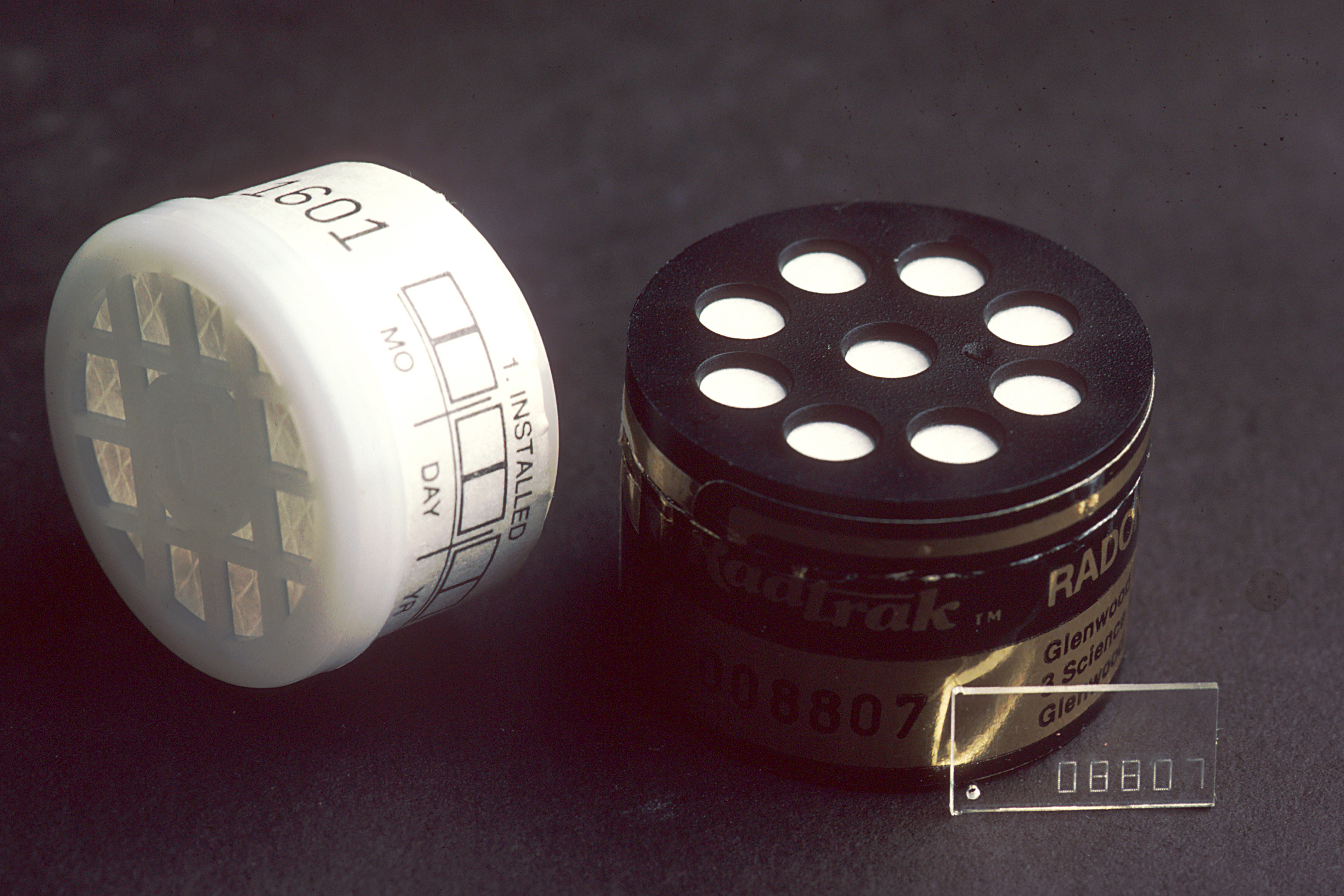
A typical radon test kit

Fluctuation of ambient air radon concentration over one week, measured in a laboratory

The first step in mitigation is testing. No level of radiation is considered completely safe, but as it cannot be eliminated, governments around the world have set various action levels to provide guidance on when radon concentrations should be reduced. The World Health Organization's International Radon Project has recommended an action level of 100 Bq/m^{3} (2.7 pCi/L) for radon in the air. Radon in the air is considered to be a larger health threat than radon in domestic water. The US Environmental Protection Agency recommendation is to not test for radon in water unless a radon in air test shows concentrations above the action level. However, in some U.S. states such as Maine where radon levels are higher than the national average, it is recommended that all well water should be tested for radon. The U.S. government has not set an action level for radon in water.

Air-radon levels fluctuate naturally on a daily and seasonal basis. A short term test (90 days or less) might not be an accurate assessment of a home's average radon level, but is recommended for initial testing to quickly determine unhealthy conditions. Transient weather such as wind and changes in barometric pressure can affect short-term concentrations as well as ventilation, such as open windows and the operation of exhaust fans.

Testing for radon in the air is accomplished using passive or active devices placed in the building. Some devices are promptly sent to a laboratory for analysis, others calculate the results on-site including digital Radon detectors. Radon-in-water testing requires a water sample being sent to a laboratory.

Retesting is recommended in several situations, for example, before spending money on the installation of a mitigation system. Test results which exceed accuracy tolerances also require re-testing. When a mitigation system installation is warranted, a retest after the system is functional is advised to be sure the system is effectively reducing the radon concentration below the action level, and after any mitigation system repairs such as replacing a fan unit. The US EPA recommends retesting homes with radon problems every two years to ensure proper system function. Due to the vast fluctuation in indoor radon levels, the EPA recommends all homes be tested at least once every five years.

=== Testing in the United States ===
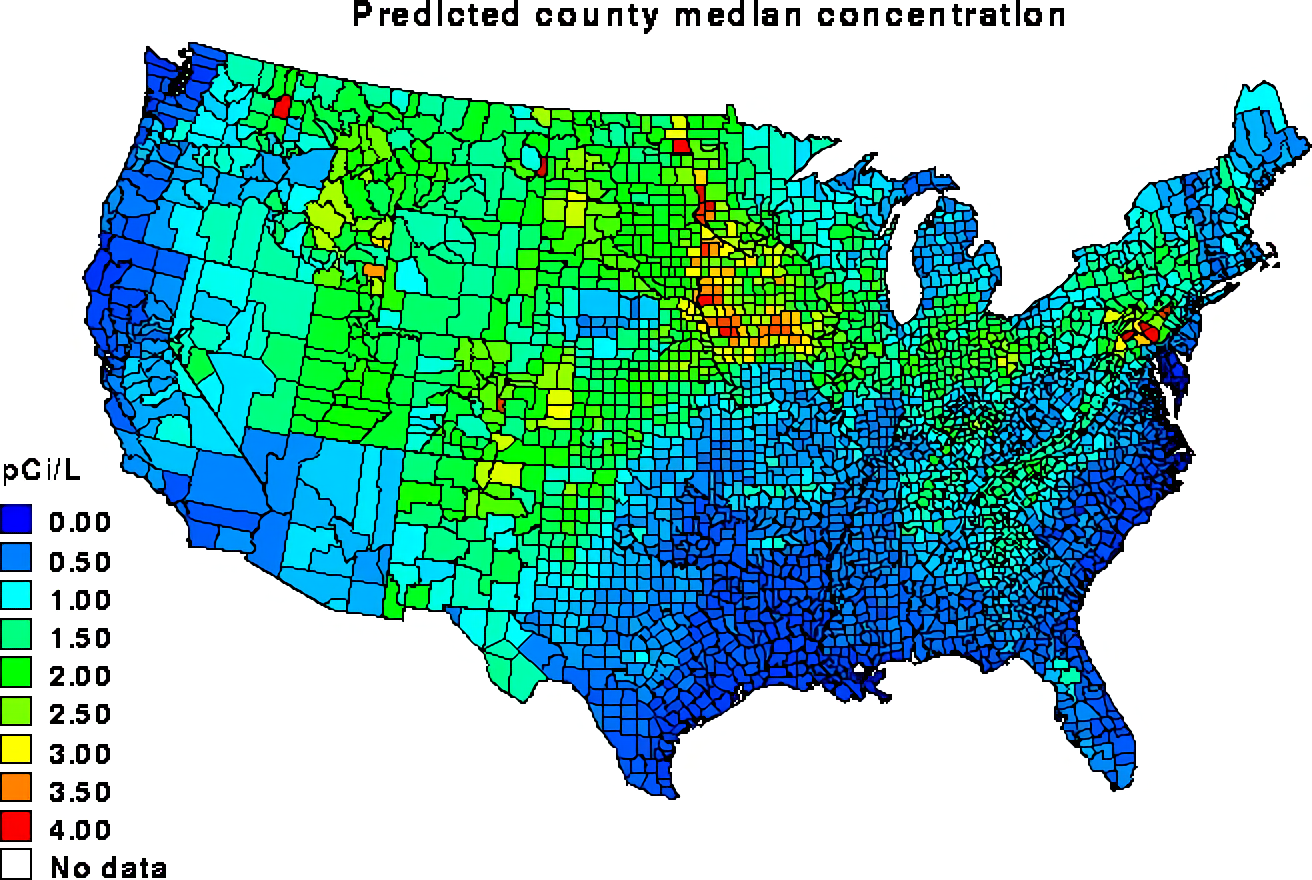
Radon map of the United States

ASTM E-2121 is a US standard for reducing airborne radon in homes as far as practicable below the action level of 4 picocuries per liter (pCi/L) (148 Bq/m^{3}). Some states recommend achieving 2.0 pCi/L or less.

Radon test kits are commercially available and can be used by homeowners and tenants and in limited cases by landlords, except when a property is for sale.

Commercially available test kits include a passive collector that the user places in the lowest livable floor of the house for 2 to 7 days. The user then sends the collector to a laboratory for analysis. Long-term kits, taking collections from 91 days to one year, are also available. Open land test kits can test radon emissions from the land before construction begins, but are not recommended by the EPA because they do not accurately predict the final indoor radon level. The EPA and the National Environmental Health Association have identified 15 types of radon test devices. A Lucas cell is one type of device.

Retesting is specifically recommended in several situations. Measurements between 4 and 10 pCi/L (148 and 370 Bq/m^{3}) warrant a follow-up short-term or long-term radon test before mitigation. Measurements over 10 pCi/L (370 Bq/m^{3}) warrant only another short-term test (not a long-term test) so that abatement measures are not unduly delayed.

Progress has been made regarding radon in the home. A total of 37 states have now passed legislation requiring home-sellers to disclose known radon levels before completing the transaction (although only a handful have introduced criminal penalties for misrepresentation). And over half the legislatures have written radon into their state's building code. Purchasers of real estate may delay or decline a purchase if the seller has not successfully abated radon to less than 4 pCi/L.

The accuracy of the residential radon test depends upon whether closed house conditions are maintained. Thus the occupants will be instructed not to open windows, etc., for ventilation during the pendency of test, usually two days or more. However, the occupants, if the present owners, will be motivated to pass the test and insure the sale, so they might be tempted to open a window to get a lower radon score. Moreover, there may be children or immature teens or young adults in the house who will open a window for ventilation notwithstanding instructions not to do so, particularly in uncomfortably hot weather. Accordingly, whether the potential purchaser should trust the result of such a test is problematic.

Management of radon service provider certification has evolved since being introduced by the EPA in 1986. In the 1990s this service was "privatized" and the National Environmental Health Association (NEHA) helped transition the voluntary National Radon Proficiency Program (NRPP) to be administered by private firms. As of 2012, the NRPP is administered by the American Association of Radon Scientists and Technologists (AARST).

Some states, such as Maine, require landlords to test their rental properties and turn the results in to the state. In limited cases the landlord or tenants may do the testing themselves. The rules in each state vary. In many cases there are private contractors that will inspect hired by the city.

=== Testing in Canada ===
Health Canada recommends regular annual testing, either by hiring a qualified tester or by using a home-testing kit that should be checked quarterly.

Canadian Government, in conjunction with the territories and provinces, developed the guideline to indicate when remedial action should be taken was originally set at 800 Bq/m^{3} (becquerels per cubic meter) and since reduced to 200 Bq/m^{3}. This new guideline was approved by the Federal Provincial Territorial Radiation Protection Committee in October 2006.

=== Testing in the UK ===
Radon testing in the UK is managed by UKradon and the UKHSA.

=== Testing in Norway ===
The Norwegian Radiation and Nuclear Safety Authority (DSA) developed the protocol for radon measurements in residential dwellings with respect to rental accommodation, which is governed by The Radiation Protection Regulations.

== Methods of radon gas mitigation ==
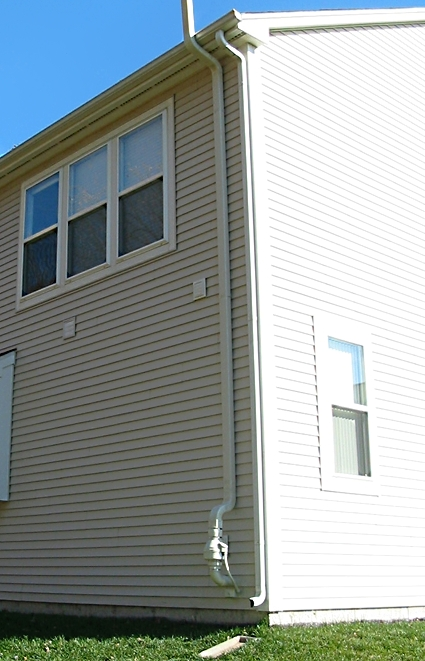
Part of a radon mitigation system including the fan and vent pipe is visible near the gutter downspout.

Because high levels of radon have been found in every state of the United States, testing for radon and installing radon mitigation systems has become a specialized industry since the 1980s. Many states have implemented programs that affect home buying and awareness in the real estate community; however, radon testing and mitigation systems are not generally mandatory unless specified by the local jurisdiction.

Anticipated high radon levels can be mitigated during building design and construction by a combination of ensuring a perfectly sealed foundation, allowing sufficient passive dispersal of under-slab gas around rather than through the building, and proper building ventilation. In many instances, such approaches may achieve a sufficient reduction of radon levels compared to other buildings where such approaches were not taken. However, quality of implementation is crucial and testing after construction is necessary. For instance, even a small gap in the sealing of the slab may be sufficient for excessive quantities of radon to enter, given pressure differentials.

Where such approaches were not taken during construction or have proven insufficiently effective, remediation is needed. According to the EPA's "A Citizen's Guide to Radon", the method to reduce radon "primarily used is a vent pipe system and fan, which pulls radon from beneath the house and vents it to the outside", which is also called sub-slab depressurization, soil suction, or active soil depressurization (ASD). Generally indoor radon can be mitigated by sub-slab depressurization and exhausting such radon-laden air to the outdoors, away from windows and other building openings. "EPA generally recommends methods which prevent the entry of radon. Soil suction, for example, prevents radon from entering your home by drawing the radon from below the home and venting it through a pipe, or pipes, to the air above the home where it is quickly diluted" and "EPA does not recommend the use of sealing alone to reduce radon because, by itself, sealing has not been shown to lower radon levels significantly or consistently" according to the EPA's "Consumer's Guide to Radon Reduction: How to Fix Your Home". Ventilation systems can utilize a heat exchanger or energy recovery ventilator to recover part of the energy otherwise lost in the process of exchanging air with the outside. For crawlspaces, the EPA states, "An effective method to reduce radon levels in crawlspace homes involves covering the earth floor with a high-density plastic sheet. A vent pipe and fan are used to draw the radon from under the sheet and vent it to the outdoors. This form of soil suction is called submembrane suction, and when properly applied is the most effective way to reduce radon levels in crawlspace homes."

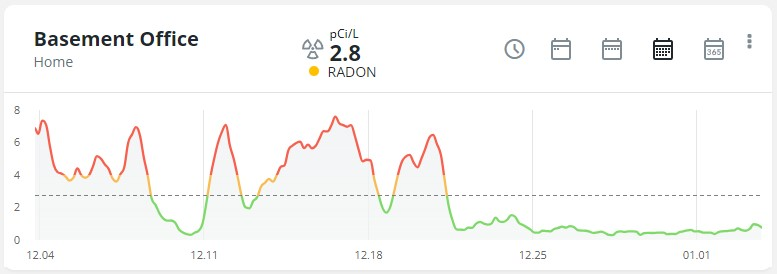
High radon levels in a Minnesota (USA) basement with a passive under slab vent pipe system can be seen in the left half of the graph. After installation of a radon fan (ASD), a permanent reduction in radon levels to approximately 0.6 pCi/L can be seen in the right half of the graph.

- The most common approach is active soil depressurization (ASD). Experience has shown that ASD is applicable to most buildings since radon usually enters from the soil and rock underneath and mechanical ventilation is used when the indoor radon is emitted from the building materials. A less common approach works efficiently by reducing air pressures within cavities of exterior and demising walls where radon emitting from building materials, most often concrete blocks, collects.
- Above slab air pressure differential barrier technology (ASAPDB) requires that the interior pressure envelope, most often drywall, as well as all ductwork for air conditioning systems, be made as airtight as possible. A small blower, often no more than 15 cubic feet per minute (0.7 L/s) may then extract the radon-laden air from these cavities and exhaust it to the out of doors. With well-sealed HVAC ducts, very small negative pressures, perhaps as little as 0.5 pascal (0.00007 psi), will prevent the entry of highly radon-laden wall cavity air from entering into the breathing zone. Such ASAPDB technology is often the best radon mitigation choice for high-rise condominiums as it does not increase indoor humidity loads in hot humid climates, and it can also work well to prevent mold growth in exterior walls in heating climates.
- In hot, humid climates, heat recovery ventilators (HRV) as well as energy recovery ventilators (ERV) have a record of increasing indoor relative humidity and dehumidification demands on air conditioning systems. Mold problems can occur in homes that have been radon mitigated with HRV and ERV installations in hot, humid climates. HRVs and ERVs have an excellent record in cold dry climates.
- A recent technology is based on building science. It includes a variable rate mechanical ventilation system that prevents indoor relative humidity from rising above a preset level such as 50% which is currently suggested by the US Environmental Protection Agency and others as an upper limit for the prevention of mold. It has proven to be especially effective in hot, humid climates. It controls the air delivery rate so that the air conditioner is never overloaded with more moisture than it can effectively remove from the indoor air.
  - It is generally assumed that air conditioner operation will remove excess moisture from the air in the breathing zone, but just because the air conditioner cools does not mean that it is also dehumidfying. If Δt is 14 degrees or less, it may not dehumidify at all even though it is cooling.
  - Factors that are likely to aggravate indoor humidity problems from mechanical ventilation–based radon installations are as follows and an expert radon mitigator/building scientist will check for and correct any and all of the following when he or she performs radon mitigation procedures:
    - Air conditioner duct leaks located outside the breathing zone, such as in the attic.
    - Excessive exhaust fan operation
    - Oversize or over-capacity air conditioners
    - AC air handler fans that do not stop running when the air conditioner compressor stops running.
    - Delta t (Δt), which is the amount that the air is cooled as it is passed through the air conditioner's cooling coils. A good Δt performance figure for home air conditioners is about 20 °F (11 °C). In comparison, automobile air conditioners deliver Δt performance of 32 to 38 °F (18 to 21 °C). A Δt of 14 °F (8 °C) will dehumidify poorly if at all.

In South Florida, most radon mitigation is performed by use of fixed rate mechanical ventilation. Radon mitigation training in Florida does not include problems associated with mechanical ventilation systems, such as high indoor humidity, mold, moldy odors, property damage or health consequences of human occupation in high humidity of moldy environments. As a result, most Florida radon mitigators are unaware of and do not incorporate existing building science moisture management technology into mechanical ventilation radon installations. Home inspectors may not necessarily be aware of the mold risks associated with radon mitigation by mechanical ventilation.

The average cost for an ASD radon mitigation system in Minnesota is $1500. These costs are very dependent on the type of home and age of construction.

== Methods of radon-in-water mitigation ==
Radon removal from water supplies may be at a treatment plant, point of entry, or point of use. Public water supplies in the United States were required to treat for radionuclides beginning in 2003 but private wells are not regulated by the federal government as of 2014. The radon can be captured by granular activated charcoal (GAR) or released into the air through aeration of the water. Radon will naturally dissipate from water over a period of days, but the quantity of storage needed to treat the water in this manner makes home systems of this type impracticably large.

Activated carbon systems capture radon from the water. The amount of radiation accumulates over time and the filter material may reach the level of requiring disposal as a radioactive waste. However, in the United States there are no regulations concerning radiation levels and disposal of radon treatment waste as of 2014.

Aeration systems move the radon from the water to the air. Radon gas discharged into the air is the release of a pollutant, and may become regulated in the United States.
