= R. William Field =

Radon gas in health specialist, PHD, Professor at the University of Iowa

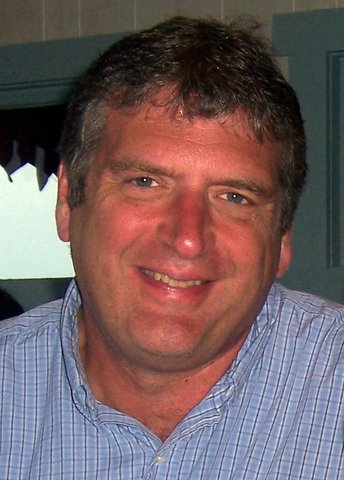
Dr. Bill Field in 2011

R. William Field is an academic scholar and Professor in the Department of Occupational and Environmental Health and Department of Epidemiology within the College of Public Health at the University of Iowa. He received a BS and MS degree in Biology from Millersville University of Pennsylvania and a PhD in Preventive Medicine from the College of Medicine at the University of Iowa in 1994. Field is currently an occupational and environmental epidemiologist as well as an internationally recognized expert on the measurement and health effects of radon gas.

He started his research career in the aftermath of the Three Mile Island accident in Pennsylvania in 1979. His study describing the occurrence of radioactive iodine in meadow voles (Microtus pennsylvanicus) was the only peer-reviewed scientific study documenting radioactive contamination of the wild food chain in the vicinity of Three Mile Island. Subsequent studies examining the deposition of cesium-137 in the white-tailed deer indicated there was not widespread contamination of cesium in the vicinity of Three Mile Island following the Three Mile Island accident.

The Iowa Radon Lung Cancer Study, which was overseen by Field, is widely considered the most comprehensive residential radon study ever performed. The study found a 50% increased lung cancer risk at the EPA's radon action level of 4 pCi/L. Field is considered one of the leading advocates in the world for the reduction of radon exposure in homes, schools and workplaces. He is also widely credited with identifying protracted radon exposure as the "leading environmental cause of cancer mortality in the United States". He has been actively involved at the local, state, national, and international level in communication efforts (i.e. research-to-practice) to reduce smoking and radon-related lung cancer since publication of the landmark radon study. In 2009, his Keynote address at the International Radon Meetings launched the World Health Organization's (WHO) Handbook on Indoor Radon - A Public Health Perspective on behalf of the WHO International Radon Project.

Field currently directs the National Institute for Occupational Safety and Health's funded Occupational Epidemiology Training Program at the University of Iowa. He has served on numerous national and international committees including the World Health Organization's International Radon Project, the United States Environmental Protection Agency's (EPA) Science Advisory Board, and as the chair of the Board's Radiation Advisory Committee in 2014. He has also previously served on numerous National Academy of Science's Committees. President Barack Obama appointed Field to the Advisory Board on Radiation and Worker Health in October 2009. The board is appointed by the President to advise the Secretary of the Department of Health and Human Services on its activities under the Energy Employees Occupational Illness Compensation Program Act of 2000. In 2011, Field was honored as the recipient of Millersville University of Pennsylvania's highest alumni honor, the Distinguished Alumni Award and in 2012 received the University of Iowa's Michael J Brody Award, which is considered one of the highest awards for faculty, for his long-term efforts to improve the health of the state and nation.
