= Xenohormesis =

Xenohormesis is a hypothesis that posits that certain molecules such as plant polyphenols, which indicate stress in the plants, can have benefits for another organism (heterotrophs) that consumes it. Or in simpler terms, xenohormesis is interspecies hormesis. The expected benefits include improve lifespan and fitness, by activating the animal's cellular stress response.

This may be useful to evolve, as it gives possible cues about the state of the environment. If the plants an animal is eating have increased polyphenol content, it means the plant is under stress and may signal famines. Using the chemical cues the heterotophs could preemptively prepare and defend itself before conditions worsen. A possible example may be resveratrol, which is famously found in red wine, which modulates over two dozen receptors and enzymes in mammals.

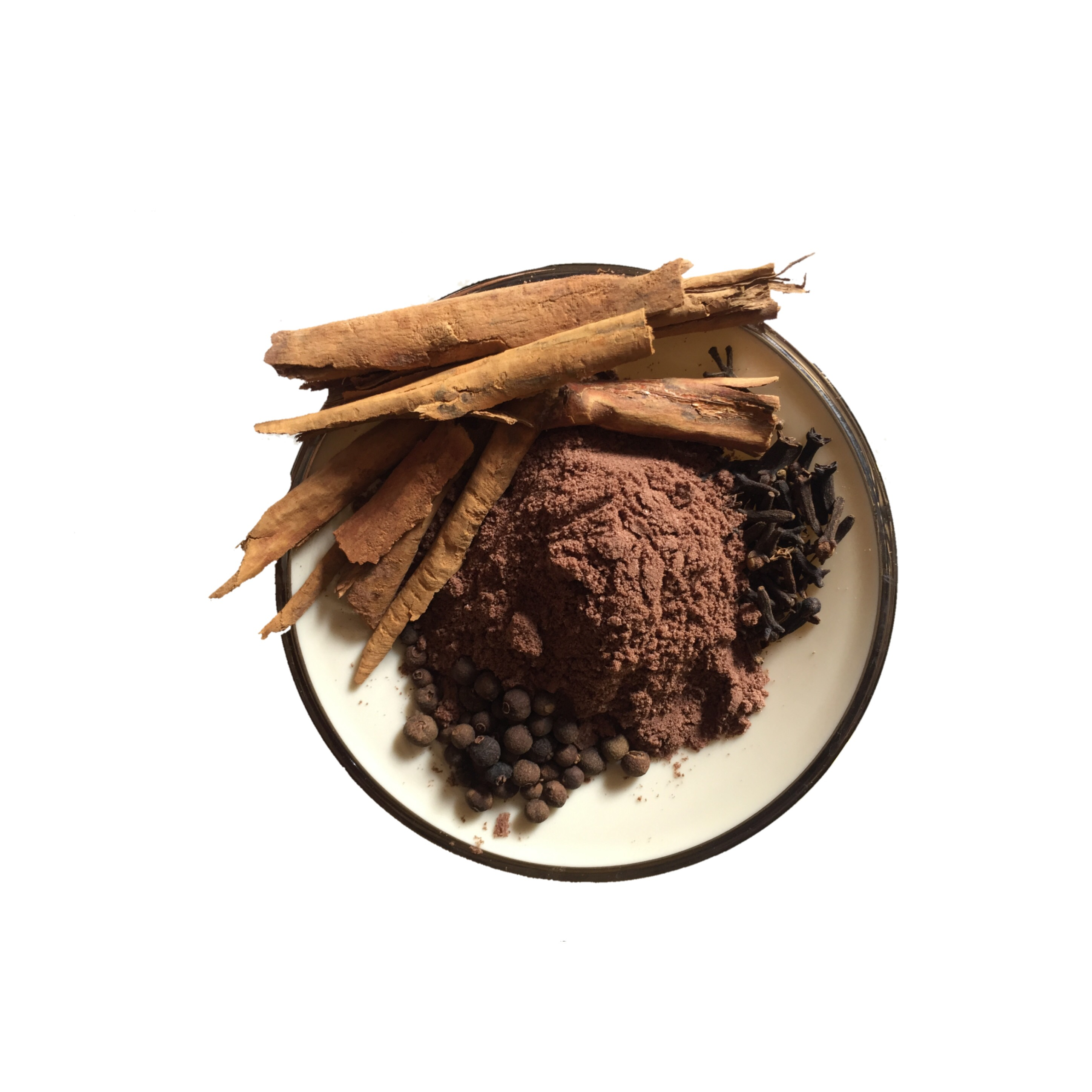
Cinnamon

Xenohormesis could also explain several phenomena seen in the ethno-pharmaceutical (traditional medicine) side of things. Such as in the case of cinnamon, which in a few studies has been found to have an effect on lipid, glucose, and HbA1c levels in type 2 diabetes, but upon meta analysis was found to have no significant effect. One group of authors suggested this might be caused by the cinnamon used in one study differing from the other in xenohormetic properties.

Some explanations as to why this works, is first and foremost, it could be a coincidence. Especially for cases which partially venomous products, cause a positive stress in the organism. The second is that it is a shared evolutionary attribute, as both animals and plants share a huge amount of homology between their pathways. The third is that there is evolutionary pressure to evolve to better respond to the molecules. The latter is proposed mainly by Howitz and his team.

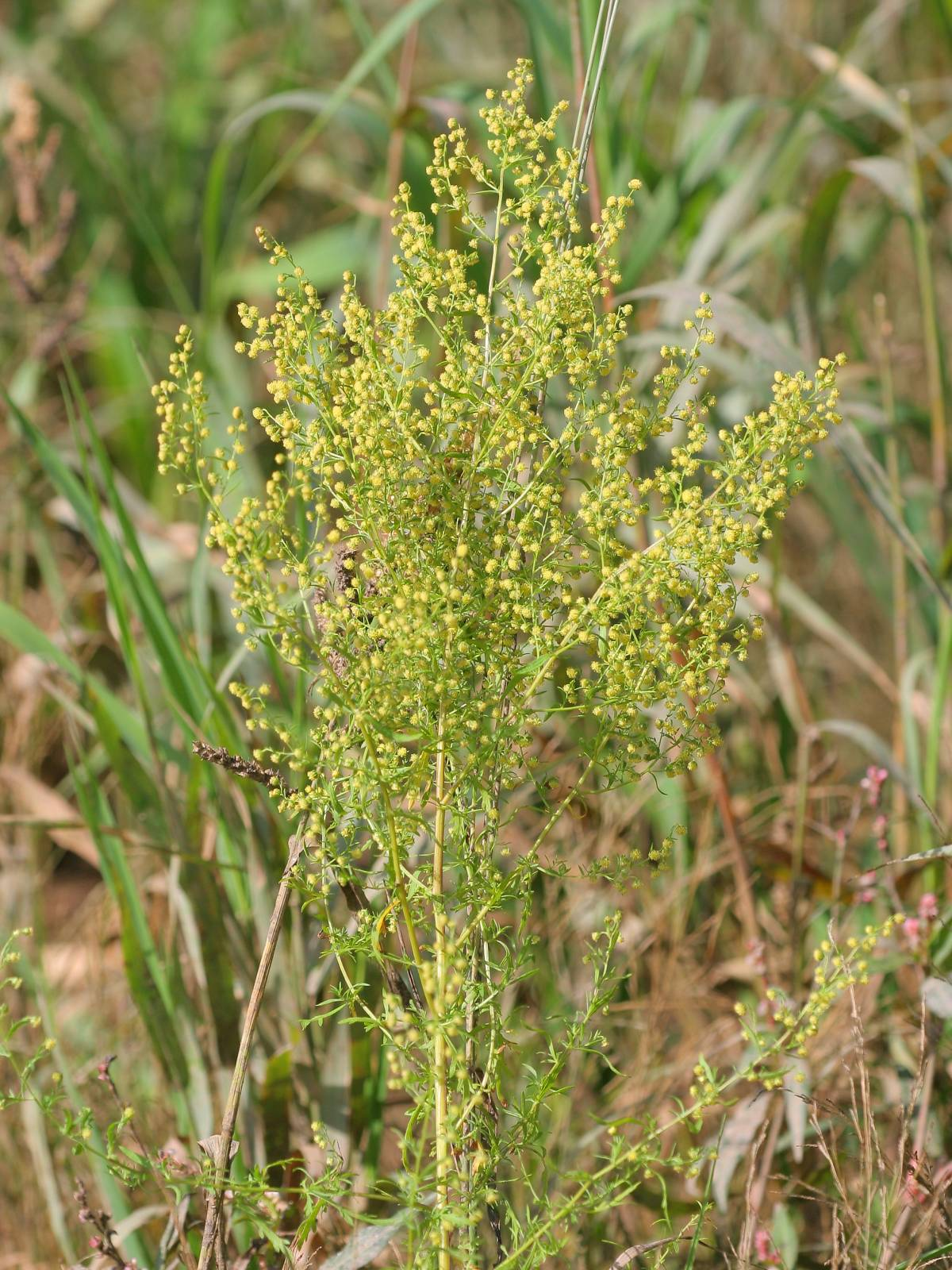
Artemisia annua

There also might be the problem that our focus on maximizing the crop output, may be losing many of the xenohormetic advantages. Under the xenohormesis hypothesis, although the ideal conditions will cause the plant to increase its crop output, the reduced stress of the ideal conditions might reduce beneficial xenohormetic effects in humans.

== Etymology ==
The term xenohormesis was first coined by Kondrad T. Howitz and David A. Sinclair, in the 2004 paper "Small molecules that regulate lifespan: evidence for xenohormesis". Xeno comes from Greek, meaning foreign, and hormesis is the adaptive response of organisms and cells to stress.

== Applications ==
There are many applications for this products, mainly found in the micronutrients. One of the most obvious ones is in the pharmaceutical section. Such as the antimalarial artemisinin which is synthesised from Artemisia annua. The density of this product also increases with stress, which is probably not a coincidence, however not in a case of mutualistic xenohormesis.

It has also been shown that it affects macro nutrients, cold shock may increase the level of unsaturated fatty acids.

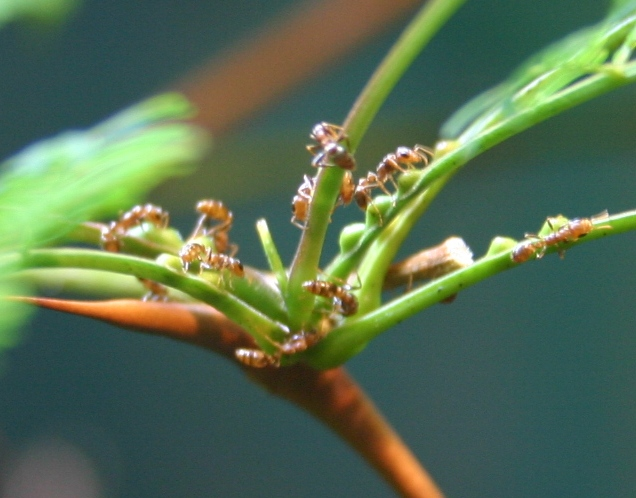
Pseudomyrmex ferruginea in Acacia

== Mutualistic Xenohormesis ==
Some times xenohormesis is targeted to specific organisms. Such as in the case Acacias, which produce food bodies, which the ants consume, in turn protecting the tree. If a herbivore feeds on an Acacia, it will release more of these bodies. In turn attracting more ants and/or wasps. There are also many cases of mutualistic xenohormesis for the dispersal of a seeds and pollen. Though not all xenohormesis is mutualistic.

== See also ==
- Hormesis
