= Hugo Paul Friedrich Schulz =

German chemist (1853–1932)

Hugo Paul Friedrich Schulz (August 6, 1853 – July 13, 1932) was a German pharmacologist from Wesel, Rhenish Prussia.

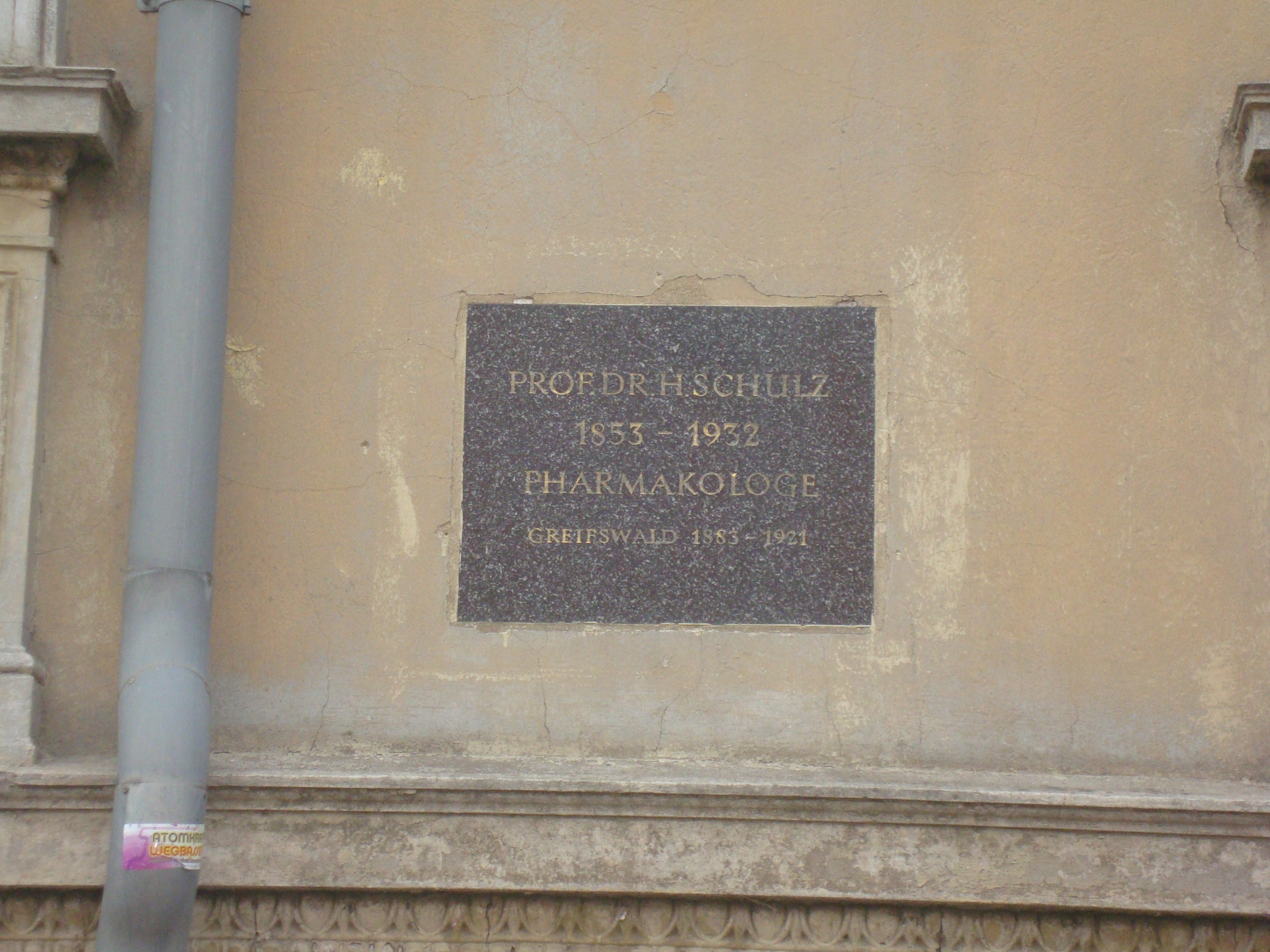
Commemorative plaque for Schulz at Bahnhofstraße 51 in Greifswald.

He studied medicine in the universities of Heidelberg and Bonn, where he did scientific work in the physiological institute of Eduard Friedrich Wilhelm Pflüger (1829-1910). In 1877 he earned his doctorate, and afterwards worked in the pharmacological institute of Karl Binz (1832-1913) at Bonn. In 1883 he was appointed professor of pharmacology at the University of Greifswald.

Schulz is known for his research of a phenomenon known as hormesis, showing that the effect of toxins in small doses can be the opposite of their effect in large doses. He demonstrated this in experiments using chemical compounds on yeast cells. From his research came the "Arndt-Schulz rule", a law concerning dosages in toxicology, named along with Dr. Rudolf Arndt (1835-1900).

Schulz published a number of works in the field of pharmacology, including the well-regarded Pharmakotherapie (1898), a treatise that was included in Albert Eulenburg's Handbuch der allgemeinen Therapie und der therapeutischen Methodik.

== Works ==
- Die officinellen Pflanzen und Pflanzenpräparate : zum Gebrauch für Studirende und Ärzte übersichtlich zusammengestellt . Bergmann, Wiesbaden 1885 Digital edition by the University and State Library Düsseldorf
