= Arndt–Schulz rule =

Law concerning the effects of pharmaca or poisons in concentrations

Arndt–Schulz rule or Schulz' law is a claimed law concerning the effects of pharmaca or poisons in various concentrations. It states that:

For every substance, small doses stimulate, moderate doses inhibit, large doses kill.

That is to say, highly diluted pharmaca or poisons enhance life processes, while strong concentrations may inhibit these processes and even terminate them.

The rule was named after Hugo Paul Friedrich Schulz and Rudolf Arndt. The latter originally formulated it in 1888. However, the exceptions to the rule are so numerous that it can not be considered a general law. For instance, many paralysing substances have no exciting effect in weak doses, and what constitutes a weak, medium, or strong stimulus is highly individual, as pointed out by Arndt himself.

The rule is no longer cited in modern pharmacology texts, having been supplanted by the theory of hormesis.

== Scientific basis for homeopathy ==
This rule has been claimed by some homeopaths as supporting their hypotheses. However, this rule does not apply to the extremely high dilutions typically used by homeopaths, which have a high probability of containing no molecules of the diluted substance. To explain the purported therapeutic powers of homeopathic remedies (only for ultra high dilutes) Jacques Benveniste created the postulate of "water memory". The water memory hypothesis defies conventional scientific understanding of physicochemical knowledge through which the perceived effect of a chemical compound after its removal from a solution is not expectable due to the assumption no molecules, no effect.

== Historical perspective ==
Early studies of how living systems react to stimuli showed that physiological responses could be obtained with some regularity upon exposure to defined doses. Devising a mechanism for these observations proved difficult, and a significant amount of scientific effort was expended on the subject. The work of Arndt and Schultz, along with that of Ernst Heinrich Weber and Gustav Theodor Fechner, was called upon to provide some explanation for the observed relationships between dose and response during the early days of pharmacology. However, the concepts Hormesis and Receptor Theory eventually supplanted such "laws" as a more complete and well-defined means of describing how chemicals and physiological systems interact.

== See also ==
- Hormesis
