= Białki, Pomeranian Voivodeship =

Białki
- Village
- Location within Poland
- Coordinates: 53°40′51″N 18°53′53″E
- Country: Poland
- Voivodeship: Pomeranian
- County: Kwidzyn
- Gmina: Sadlinki
- Population (2022): 453

Białki [ˈbjau̯ki] is a village in the administrative district of Gmina Sadlinki, within Kwidzyn County, Pomeranian Voivodeship, in northern Poland.

== Notable residents ==
- Rudolf Arndt (1835–1900), German psychiatrist
