= Rudolf Arndt =

German psychiatrist (1835–1900)

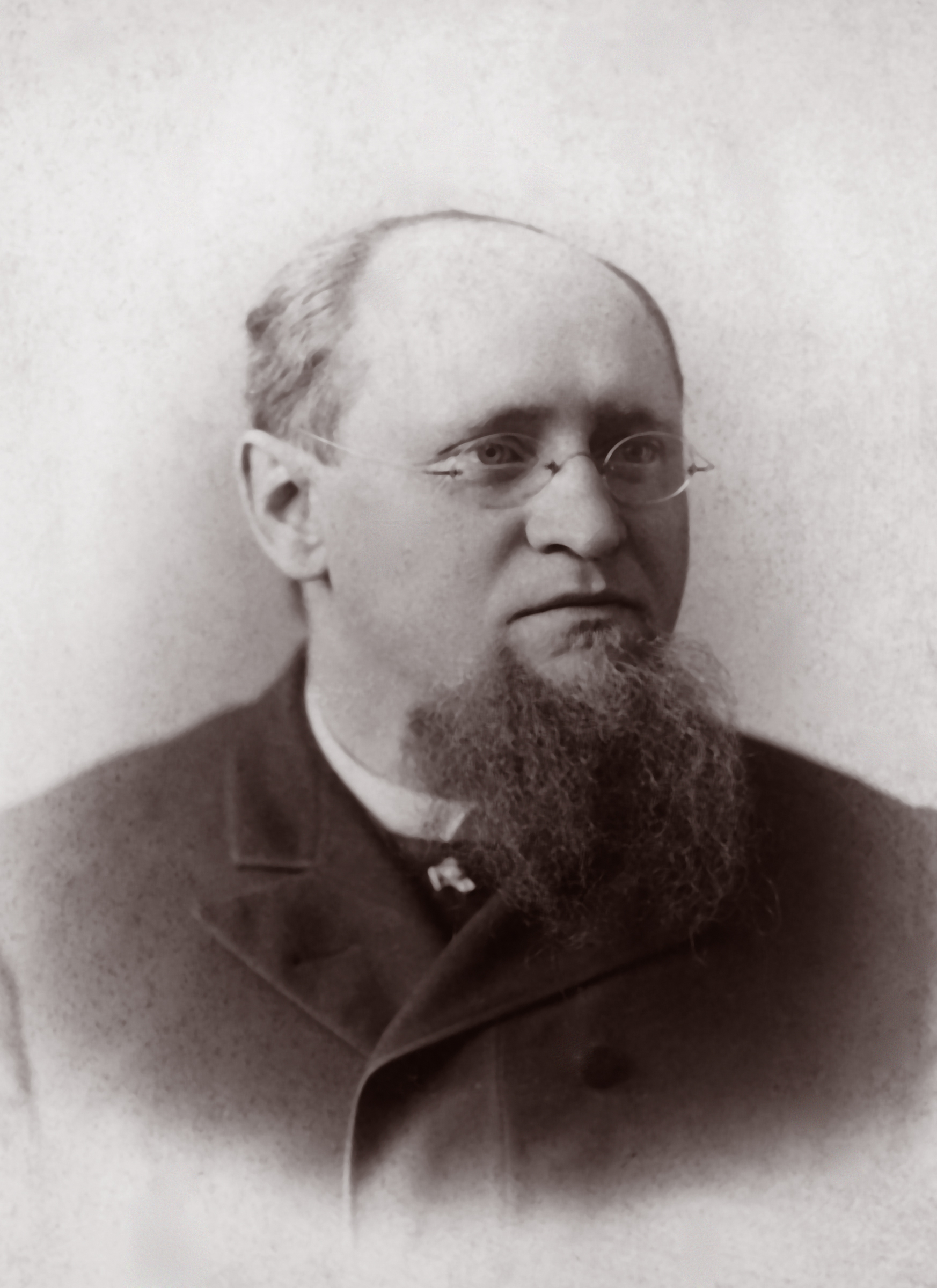
Rudolf Arndt

Rudolf Gottfried Arndt (31 March 1835 – 29 January 1900) was a German psychiatrist from Bialken, district of Marienwerder.

== Biography ==
Arndt studied in Greifswald and Halle. As a student, his instructors included Felix von Niemeyer (1820–1871), Heinrich Adolf von Bardeleben (1819–1895), and Heinrich Philipp August Damerow (1798–1866). He was conferred doctor of medicine on 20 February 1860. From 1861 he maintained a private practice, and also participated in the Second Schleswig War (1864), Austro-Prussian War (1866) and Franco-Prussian War (1870–71).

In 1867 he obtained his habilitation, subsequently serving as director of the Irren-Heil- und Pflege-Anstalt in Greifswald. In 1873 he became an associate professor of psychiatry at Greifswald. He died of angina pectoris.

He is known today for the "Arndt-Schulz rule", a pharmacologic principle of homeopathy that is named in conjunction with German chemist Hugo Schulz (1853-1932). He is also remembered for his investigations of neurasthenia.

== Awards and decorations ==
- Order of the Crown, 4th class with Swords (Prussia, 1866)
- Iron Cross of 1870, 2nd class on white-black band (Prussia, 1871)
- Knight's Cross, First Class of the Order of the Zähringer Lion (Baden)

== Selected writings ==
- Aus einem apoplectischen Gehirn, 1878 - On the apoplectic brain.
- Die Neurasthenie (Nervenschwäche), ihr Wesen, ihre Bedeutung und Behandlung, 1885 - Neurasthenia (nerve weakness), its nature, its meaning and treatment.
- Der Verlauf der Psychosen, 1887 (with August Dohm) - The course of psychosis.
- Was sind Geisteskrankheiten?, 1897 - What is mental illness?

== See also ==
- Arndt-Schulz rule
