= Edward Calabrese =

American toxicologist

Edward J. Calabrese is an American toxicologist and professor in the department of environmental health sciences at the University of Massachusetts Amherst. He is the editor emeritus of the scientific journal Dose-Response.

== Education ==
Calabrese grew up in Bridgewater, Massachusetts. He received his B.S. from Bridgewater State College in 1968 and his M.A. and Ph.D. from the University of Massachusetts Amherst in 1972 and 1973, respectively.

== Academic career ==
Calabrese began working at the University of Massachusetts Amherst in 1976.

== Research ==
Early in his career, Calabrese conducted research on carcinogens. However, he is best known for his research into, and championing of, hormesis, which he has called "the fundamental dose-response model". In 2003, Calabrese told the Wall Street Journal that the view that there is no threshold of dose below which substances have no adverse effects, as has been stated in scientific textbooks, was "an error of historic proportions."

He credits his interest in hormesis to an experiment he performed as an undergraduate in 1966. In the experiment, his instructor told Calabrese and his classmates to treat a peppermint plant with a growth-inhibiting substance, Phosfon, but when they did so, the plant responded by growing approximately 40% taller and leafier than plants not treated with the substance, the opposite of what had been expected. The class later discovered that they had accidentally used a highly diluted form of Phosfon.
