= Working level =

Unit of concentration of radioactive decay products

Working level (WL) is a historical unit of concentration of radioactive decay products of radon, applied to uranium mining environment. One working level refers to the concentration of short-lived decay products of radon in equilibrium with 3,700 Bq/m^{3} (100 pCi/L) in air. These decay products would emit 1.3 × 10^{5} MeV in complete decay. The Nuclear Regulatory Commission uses this definition.

Working level month (WLM) is a closely related quantity, referring to exposure to one working level for 170 hours per month. This comes from assuming a 40-hour work week.

In 2002, the NRC regulations limited exposure in mines to 0.3 WL, which was comparable with the standards of International Commission on Radiological Protection at the time.
