= International Radon Project =

WHO initiative to reduce risk of lung cancer

The International Radon Project (IRP) is a World Health Organization initiative to reduce the lung cancer risk around the world.

The IRP released their guidance to member countries in September 2009.

The WHO states on its website, "Exposure to radon in the home and workplace is one of the main risks of ionizing radiation causing tens of thousands of deaths from lung cancer each year globally. In order to reduce this burden it is important that national authorities have methods and tools based on solid scientific evidence and sound public health policy. The public needs to be aware of radon risks and the means to reduce and prevent these."

In 1996, WHO published a report containing several conclusions and recommendations covering the scientific understanding of radon risk and the need for countries to take action in the areas of risk management and risk communication.

Recent findings from case-control studies on lung cancer and exposure to radon in homes completed in many countries allow for substantial improvement in risk estimates and for further consolidation of knowledge by pooling data from these studies. The consistency of the findings from the latest pooled analyses of case-control studies from Europe and North America as well as China provides a strong argument for an international initiative to reduce indoor radon risks.

To fulfill these goals, WHO has developed a program on public health aspects of radon exposure. This project enjoys high priority with WHO's Department of Public Health and Environment. The key elements of the International Radon Project include:

- Estimation of the global burden of disease (GBD) associated with exposure to radon, based on the establishment of a global radon database
- Provision of guidance on methods for radon measurements and mitigation
- Developing evidence-based public health guidance for Member States to formulate policy and advocacy strategy including the establishment of radon action levels
- Development of approaches for radon risk communication.

To achieve these aims, WHO has formed a network of key partner agencies from some 40 Member States. This network is the basis for the WHO International Radon Project which was launched in 2005. Working groups will collect and analyse information on radon risk, radon policies, radon mitigation and prevention as well as risk communication. The project members meet regularly and work towards achieving the outlined objectives.
