= Lucas cell =

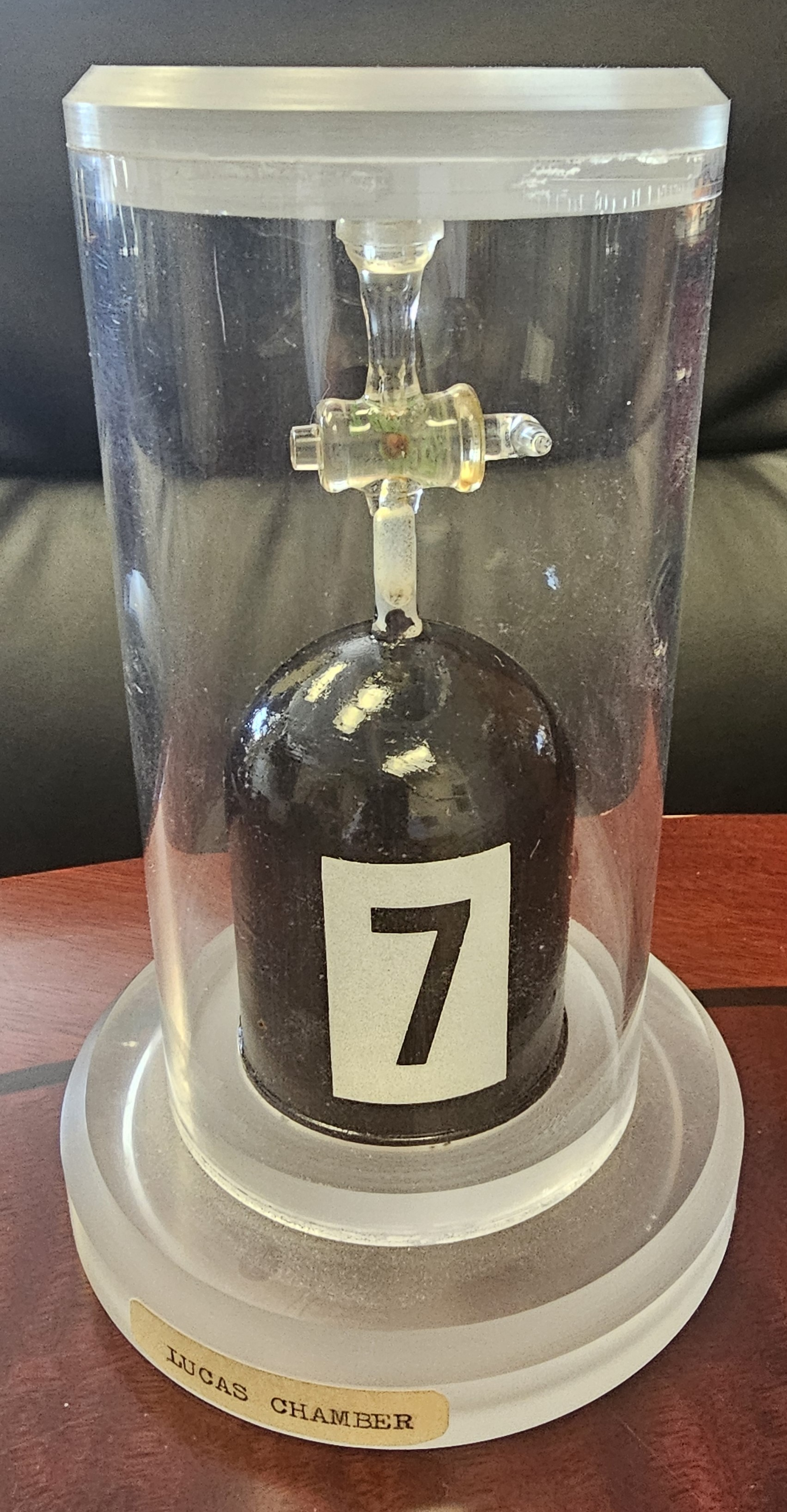
Actual Lucas cell

A Lucas cell is a type of scintillation counter. It is used to acquire a gas sample, filter out the radioactive particulates through a special filter and then count the radioactive decay of the pure gas alone. The inside of the gas chamber is coated with ZnS(Ag) - a chemical that emits light when struck by alpha particles. A photomultiplier tube pointed at the chamber counts the photons and sends the count to a data logger.

== Radon measurement ==
A Lucas cell can be used to measure radon gas concentrations. Radon itself is an inert gas. Its danger lies in the fact that it undergoes radioactive decay. The radon decay products may lodge in the lungs and bombard them with alpha and beta particles, thus increasing the risk of lung cancer.

== See also ==
- Geiger counter
- Counting efficiency
