= Hormesis =

Characteristic of biological processes

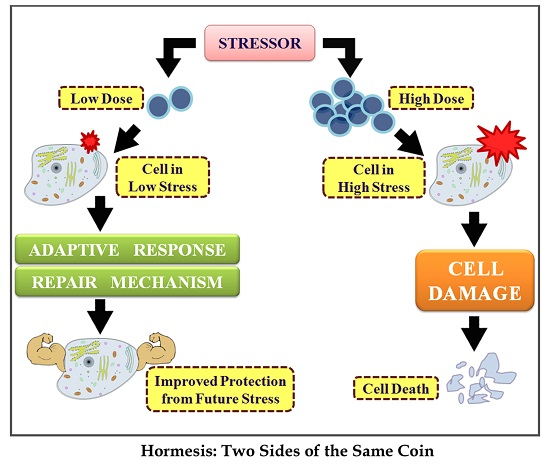
Hormesis is a biological phenomenon wherein an organism that is exposed to a low dose of a known harmful stressor has an adaptive response that may be beneficial to the organism

Hormesis is a two-phased dose–response relationship whereby low-dose exposures have a beneficial effect and high-dose amounts are either inhibitory to function or toxic. Within the hormetic zone, the biological response to low-dose amounts of some stressors is generally favorable. An example is the breathing of oxygen, which is needed in certain concentrations for respiration in aerobic animals. Exposure to elevated levels of oxygen can have beneficial effects, but it becomes toxic in high concentrations.

In toxicology, hormesis is a dose–response phenomenon to xenobiotics or other stressors. In physiology and nutrition, hormesis has regions extending from low-dose deficiencies to homeostasis, and potential toxicity at high levels. Physiological concentrations of an agent above or below homeostasis may adversely affect an organism, where the hormetic zone is a region of homeostasis of balanced nutrition. In pharmacology, the hormetic zone is similar to the therapeutic window.

In the context of toxicology, the hormesis model of dose response is vigorously debated. The biochemical mechanisms by which hormesis works (particularly in applied cases pertaining to behavior and toxins) remain under early laboratory research and are not well understood.

== Etymology ==
The term "hormesis" derives from Greek hórmēsis for "rapid motion, eagerness", itself from ancient Greek hormáein to excite. The same Greek root provides the word hormone. The term "hormetics" is used for the study of hormesis. The word hormesis was first reported in English in 1943.

== History ==
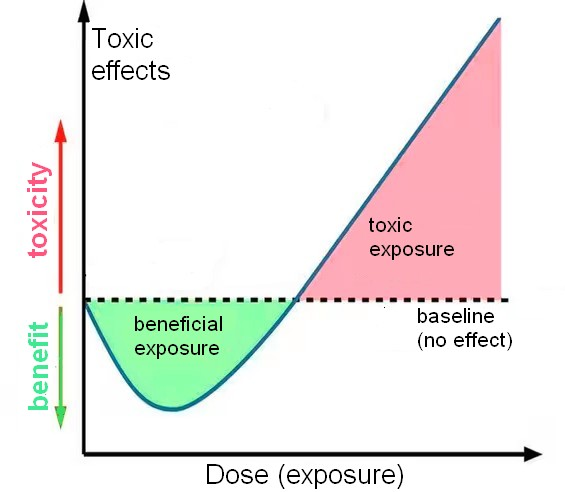
Dose–response curve for a toxic agent exhibiting hormesis: the U-shape at the bottom of the curve indicates that low doses have the opposite effect to higher doses, which cause toxicity, and are actually beneficial.

A form of hormesis famous in antiquity was Mithridatism, the practice whereby Mithridates VI of Pontus supposedly made himself immune to a variety of toxins by regular exposure to small doses. Mithridate and theriac, polypharmaceutical electuaries claiming descent from his formula and initially including flesh from poisonous animals, were consumed for centuries by emperors, kings, and queens as protection against poison and ill health. In the Renaissance, the Swiss doctor Paracelsus said, "All things are poison, and nothing is without poison; the dosage alone makes it so a thing is not a poison."

German pharmacologist Hugo Schulz first described such a phenomenon in 1888 following his own observations that the growth of yeast could be stimulated by small doses of poisons. This was coupled with the work of German physician Rudolph Arndt, who studied animals given low doses of drugs, eventually giving rise to the Arndt–Schulz rule. Arndt's advocacy of homeopathy contributed to the rule's diminished credibility in the 1920s and 1930s. The term "hormesis" was coined and used for the first time in a scientific paper by Chester M. Southam and J. Ehrlich in 1943 in the journal Phytopathology, volume 33, pp. 517–541.

In 2004, Edward Calabrese evaluated the concept of hormesis. Over 600 substances show a U-shaped dose–response relationship; Calabrese and Baldwin wrote: "One percent (195 out of 20,285) of the published articles contained 668 dose–response relationships that met the entry criteria [of a U-shaped response indicative of hormesis]"

== Examples ==
=== Carbon monoxide ===
Carbon monoxide is produced in small quantities across phylogenetic kingdoms, where it has essential roles as a neurotransmitter (subcategorized as a gasotransmitter). The majority of endogenous carbon monoxide is produced by heme oxygenase; the loss of heme oxygenase and subsequent loss of carbon monoxide signaling has catastrophic implications for an organism. In addition to physiological roles, small amounts of carbon monoxide can be inhaled or administered in the form of carbon monoxide-releasing molecules as a therapeutic agent.

Regarding the hormetic curve graph:

- Deficiency zone: an absence of carbon monoxide signaling has toxic implications
- Hormetic zone / region of homeostasis: small amount of carbon monoxide has a positive effect:
  - essential as a neurotransmitter
  - beneficial as a pharmaceutical
- Toxicity zone: excessive exposure results in carbon monoxide poisoning

=== Oxygen ===
Many organisms maintain a hormetic relationship with oxygen, which follows a hormetic curve similar to carbon monoxide:

- Deficiency zone: hypoxia / asphyxia
- Hormetic zone / region of homeostasis
- Toxicity zone: oxidative stress

==== Physical exercise ====
Physical exercise intensity may exhibit a hormetic curve. Individuals with low levels of physical activity are at risk for some diseases, and individuals engaged in moderate, regular exercise experience less disease risk. However, excessive exercise and overtraining increases the risk of disease and jeopardizes health.

==== Mitohormesis ====
The possible effect of small amounts of oxidative stress is under laboratory research. Mitochondria are sometimes described as "the powerhouse of the cell" because they generate most of the cell's supply of adenosine triphosphate (ATP), a source of chemical energy. Reactive oxygen species (ROS) have been discarded as unwanted byproducts of oxidative phosphorylation in mitochondria by the proponents of the free-radical theory of aging promoted by Denham Harman. The free-radical theory states that compounds inactivating ROS would lead to a reduction of oxidative stress and thereby produce an increase in lifespan, although this theory holds only in basic research. However, in over 19 clinical trials, "nutritional and genetic interventions to boost antioxidants have generally failed to increase life span."

Whether this concept applies to humans remains to be shown, although a 2007 epidemiological study supports the possibility of mitohormesis, indicating that supplementation with beta-carotene, vitamin A or vitamin E may increase disease prevalence in humans.

=== Alcohol ===
Alcohol is believed to be hormetic in preventing heart disease and stroke, although the benefits of light drinking may have been exaggerated. The gut microbiome of a typical healthy individual naturally ferments small amounts of ethanol, and in rare cases dysbiosis leads to auto-brewery syndrome, therefore whether benefits of alcohol are derived from the behavior of consuming alcoholic drinks or as a homeostasis factor in normal physiology via metabolites from commensal microbiota remains unclear.

=== Methylmercury ===
In 2010, a paper in the journal Environmental Toxicology & Chemistry showed that low doses of methylmercury, a potent neurotoxic pollutant, improved the hatching rate of mallard eggs. The author of the study, Gary Heinz, who led the study for the U.S. Geological Survey at the Patuxent Wildlife Research Center in Beltsville, stated that other explanations are possible. For instance, the flock he studied might have harbored some low, subclinical infection and that mercury, well known to be antimicrobial, might have killed the infection that otherwise hurt reproduction in the untreated birds.

=== Radiation ===
==== Ionizing radiation ====
Hormesis has been observed in a number of cases in humans and animals exposed to chronic low doses of ionizing radiation. A-bomb survivors who received high doses exhibited shortened lifespan and increased cancer mortality, but those who received low doses had lower cancer mortality than the Japanese average.

In Taiwan, recycled radiocontaminated steel was inadvertently used in the construction of over 100 apartment buildings, causing the long-term exposure of 10,000 people. The average dose rate was 50 mSv/year and a subset of the population (1,000 people) received a total dose over 4,000 mSv over ten years. In the widely used linear no-threshold model used by regulatory bodies, the expected cancer deaths in this population would have been 302 with 70 caused by the extra ionizing radiation, with the remainder caused by natural background radiation. The observed cancer rate, though, was quite low at 7 cancer deaths when 232 would be predicted by the LNT model had they not been exposed to the radiation from the building materials. Ionizing radiation hormesis appears to be at work.

==== Chemical and ionizing radiation combined ====
No experiment can be performed in perfect isolation. Thick lead shielding around a chemical dose experiment to rule out the effects of ionizing radiation is built and rigorously controlled for in the laboratory, and certainly not the field. Likewise the same applies for ionizing radiation studies. Ionizing radiation is released when an unstable particle releases radiation, creating two new substances and energy in the form of an electromagnetic wave. The resulting materials are then free to interact with any environmental elements, and the energy released can also be used as a catalyst in further ionizing radiation interactions.

The resulting confusion in the low-dose exposure field (radiation and chemical) arise from lack of consideration of this concept as described by Mothersill and Seymory.

=== Nucleotide excision repair ===
Veterans of the Gulf War (1991) who suffered from the persistent symptoms of Gulf War illness (GWI) were likely exposed to stresses from toxic chemicals and/or radiation. The DNA damaging (genotoxic) effects of such exposures can be, at least partially, overcome by the DNA nucleotide excision repair (NER) pathway. Lymphocytes from GWI veterans exhibited a significantly elevated level of NER repair. It was suggested that this increased NER capability in exposed veterans was likely a hormetic response, that is, an induced protective response resulting from battlefield exposure.

== Applications ==
=== Effects in aging ===
One of the areas where the concept of hormesis has been explored for its applicability is aging. Since the basic survival capacity of any biological system depends on its homeostatic ability, biogerontologists proposed that exposing cells and organisms to mild stress should result in the adaptive or hormetic response with various biological benefits.

== Controversy ==
Hormesis suggests dangerous substances have benefits. Concerns exist that the concept has been leveraged by lobbyists to weaken environmental regulations of some well-known toxic substances in the US.

=== Radiation controversy ===
The hypothesis of hormesis has generated the most controversy when applied to ionizing radiation. This hypothesis is called radiation hormesis. For policy-making purposes, the commonly accepted model of dose response in radiobiology is the linear no-threshold model (LNT), which assumes a strictly linear dependence between the risk of radiation-induced adverse health effects and radiation dose, implying that there is no safe dose of radiation for humans.

Nonetheless, many countries including the Czech Republic, Germany, Austria, Poland, and the United States have radon therapy centers whose whole primary operating principle is the assumption of radiation hormesis, or beneficial impact of small doses of radiation on human health. Countries such as Germany and Austria at the same time have imposed very strict antinuclear regulations, which have been described as radiophobic inconsistency.

The United States National Research Council (part of the National Academy of Sciences), the National Council on Radiation Protection and Measurements (a body commissioned by the United States Congress) and the United Nations Scientific Committee on the Effects of Ionizing Radiation all agree that radiation hormesis is not clearly shown, nor clearly the rule for radiation doses.

A United States–based National Council on Radiation Protection and Measurements stated in 2001 that evidence for radiation hormesis is insufficient and radiation protection authorities should continue to apply the LNT model for purposes of risk estimation.

A 2005 report commissioned by the French National Academy concluded that evidence for hormesis occurring at low doses is sufficient and LNT should be reconsidered as the methodology used to estimate risks from low-level sources of radiation, such as deep geological repositories for nuclear waste.

=== Policy consequences ===
Hormesis remains largely unknown to the public, requiring a policy change for a possible toxin to consider exposure risk of small doses.

== See also ==
- Calorie restriction
- Michael Ristow
- Petkau effect
- Radiation hormesis
- Stochastic resonance
- Mithridatism
- Xenohormesis
- Antifragility
- Post-traumatic growth
- Eustress
