= Radiation Research Society =

US-based organization for radiation research

- Abbreviation: RRS
- Formation: 1952
- Founder: Raymond E. Zirkle
- Location: Billings, Montana, USA
- Region served: United States
- Official language: English
- President: Rebecca Abergel
- Website: https://www.radres.org/

The Radiation Research Society (RRS) is a US-based international professional association for scientists working to investigate the radiation effects from chemistry, physics, biology, medicine and epidemiology perspectives and disseminates knowledge and information related to radiation research. The society was founded in 1952 with Raymond E. Zirkle as its inaugural president. The society publishes the journal Radiation Research since 1954.

== Presidents of the Radiation Research Society ==
A list of the presidents of the society from its foundation to the present.

- 1952 - Raymond E. Zirkle
- 1953 - Gioacchino Failla
- 1954 - Alexander Hollaender
- 1955 - Austin M. Brues
- 1956 - Henry S. Kaplan
- 1957 - Howard J. Curtis
- 1958 - Milton Burton
- 1959 - Ernest C. Pollard
- 1960 - Harvey M. Patt
- 1961 - Hymer L. Friedell
- 1962 - Cornelius A. Tobias
- 1963 - Augustine O. Allen
- 1964 - Edward Lawrence Powers Jr.
- 1965 - Arthur C. Upton
- 1966 - Robley D. Evans
- 1967 - John L. Magee
- 1968 - Arnold Hicks Sparrow
- 1969 - Charles L. Dunham
- 1970 - John S. Laughlin
- 1971 - Nathaniel F. Barr
- 1972 - Alan Douglas Conger
- 1973 - Victor P. Bond
- 1974 - Harald H. Rossi
- 1975 - Robert H. Schuler
- 1976 - Robert F. Kallman
- 1977 - Theodore L. Phillips
- 1978 - Warren K. Sinclair
- 1979 - William C. Dewey
- 1980 - Oddvar F. Nygaard
- 1981 - Mortimer M. Elkind
- 1982 - H. Rodney Withers
- 1983 - Edward R. Epp
- 1984 - Eric J. Hall
- 1985 - John F. Ward
- 1986 - John B. Little
- 1987 - Herman D. Suit
- 1988 - George M. Hahn
- 1989 - Joel S. Bedford
- 1990 - John D. Zimbrick
- 1991 - Susan S. Wallace
- 1992 - James A. Belli
- 1993 - Gordon F. Whitmore
- 1994 - Helen H. Evans
- 1995 - Gerald E. Adams
- 1996 - J. Martin Brown
- 1997 - C. Norman Coleman
- 1998 - William A. Bernhard
- 1999 - Elizabeth L. Travis
- 2000 - John L. Redpath
- 2001 - James B. Mitchell
- 2002 - W. Gillies McKenna
- 2003 - George Iliakis
- 2004 - Robert L. Ullrich
- 2005 - Michael D. Sevilla
- 2006 - William H. McBride
- 2007 - Mark W. Dewhirst
- 2008 - Peter M. Corry
- 2009 - Kathryn D. Held
- 2010 - Peter O'Neill
- 2011 - Jacqueline P. Williams
- 2012 - Tom K. Hei
- 2013 - Francis A. Cucinotta
- 2014 - Gayle E. Woloschak
- 2015 - Martin Hauer-Jensen
- 2016 - Charles Limoli
- 2017 - Kevin Prise
- 2018 - David Kirsch
- 2019 - Susan Bailey
- 2020 - George Don Jones
- 2021 - Sally A. Amundson
- 2022 - Julie K. Schwarz
- 2023 - Jan P. Schuemann
- 2024 - Doug R. Boreham
- 2025 - Rebecca Abergel

== See also ==
- Polish Radiation Research Society
- Health Physics Society
