= Gilbert Wheeler Beebe =

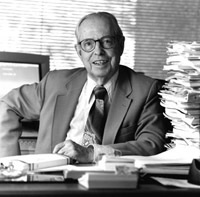
Gilbert Wheeler Beebe

Gilbert Wheeler Beebe (April 3, 1912 – March 3, 2003) was an American epidemiologist and statistician who performed studies of radiation-related mortality and morbidity among those exposed to the atomic bombings of Hiroshima and Nagasaki and the Chernobyl reactor accident.

Born in Mahwah, New Jersey, Beebe earned his undergraduate degree at Dartmouth College in 1933 and a Master's Degree and Ph.D. from Columbia University in sociology and statistics.

In longitudinal studies performed by the National Academy of Sciences as part of the Atomic Bomb Casualty Commission / Radiation Effects Research Foundation over a two-decade period starting in 1958, Beebe studied more than a quarter million individuals who had been in Hiroshima and Nagasaki during the atomic bombings in August 1945. His findings showed that there were age-dependent responses to the ionizing radiation, with women above 40 least likely to contract cancer, while pre-teen girls were much more likely to be diagnosed with breast cancer. After the Chernobyl disaster in 1986, Beebe worked with the National Cancer Institute to study more than 80,000 workers who had been involved in the cleanup.

He died on March 3, 2003, in Washington, D.C.
