= Michel Serres =

French philosopher (1930–2019)

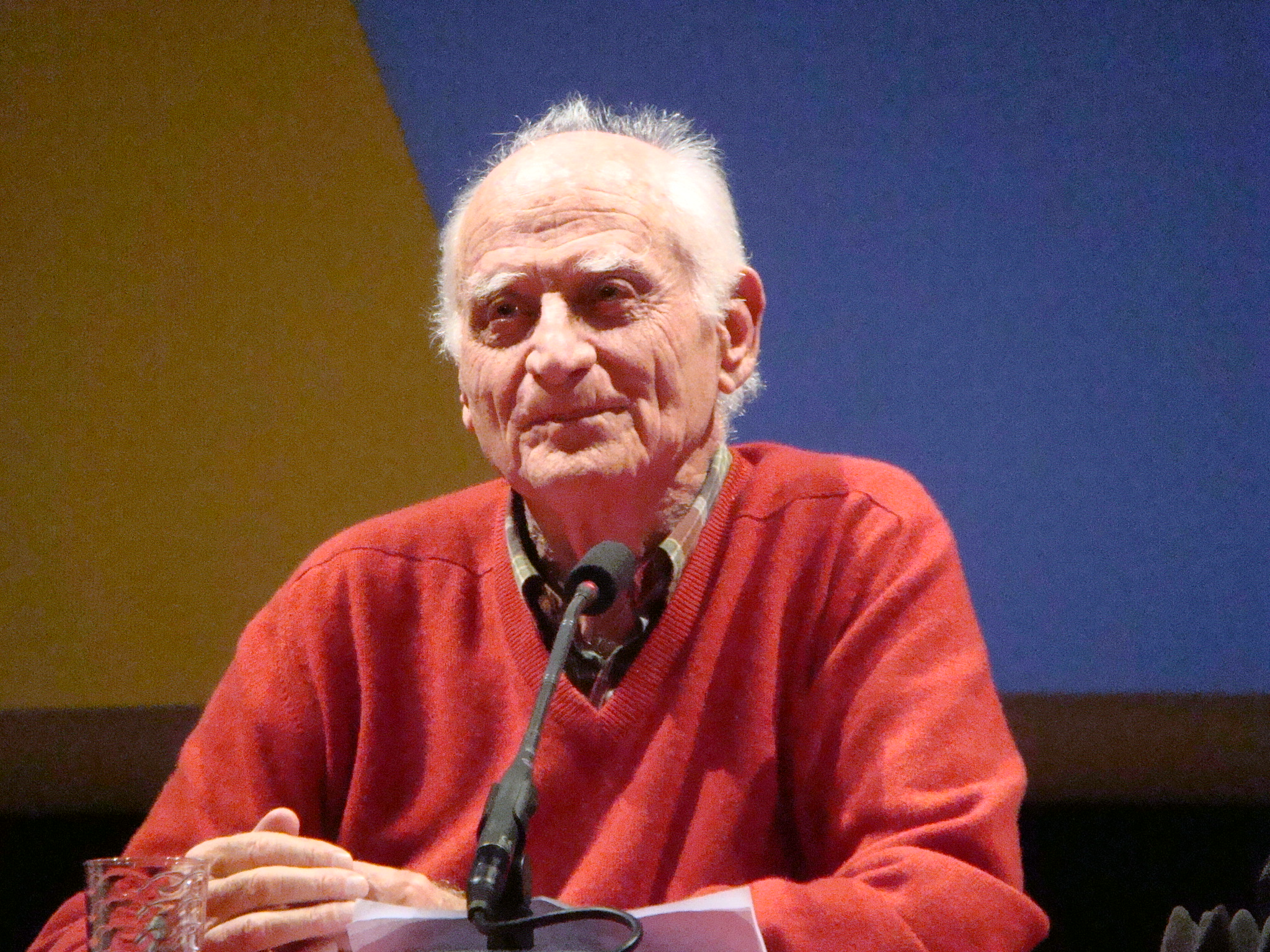
- Michel Serres in 2011
- Born: 1 September 1930; Agen, Lot-et-Garonne, France
- Died: 1 June 2019 (aged 88); Paris, France

Education
- Education: École Navale; École Normale Supérieure; University of Paris
- Doctoral advisor: Jean Hyppolite

Philosophical work
- Era: Contemporary philosophy
- Region: Western philosophy
- School: Continental philosophy French epistemology
- Institutions: University of Paris I Stanford University
- Main interests: Epistemology; Philosophy of science
- Notable ideas: Hermes (the messenger of the gods) as standing for the communication taking place between science and the arts

Michel Serres (/sɛər/; French: [miʃɛl sɛʁ]; 1 September 1930 – 1 June 2019) was a French philosopher and historian of science. Member of the Académie française and the European Academy of Sciences and Arts, he published more than 70 authoritative works during his lifetime in the fields of anthropology of science and technology, the philosophy of communication and digital technologies, the philosophy of education, and the philosophy of ecology. Michel Serres's work is characterized by a transversal and interdisciplinary approach, connecting hard sciences and the humanities. He developed an original and innovative line of thought that has profoundly influenced contemporary philosophy.

== Early life ==
Michel Serres was born on September 1, 1930, in Agen (France). He is the son of Jean Serres, who ran a dredging company on the Garonne River in Agen. He married in 1952 and had four children.

As a child, Serres witnessed firsthand the violence and devastation of war. "I was six for my first dead bodies," he told Bruno Latour. These formative experiences led him consistently to eschew a scholar career based upon models of war, suspicion, and criticism.

== Education ==
In 1947, Michel Serres obtained both the scientific baccalauréat and the literary baccalauréat at the Lycée Montaigne in Bordeaux. He then enrolled there in the "maths sup" (advanced mathematics) preparatory class. In 1949, he entered France's naval academy, the École Navale, in 1949. However, he resigned from the École Navale after just one term, driven by his antimilitarist convictions, which were intensified by the horror of the atomic bombings of Hiroshima and Nagasaki.

He then devoted himself to university studies in mathematics at the University of Bordeaux, earning his licence (bachelor's degree) in 1950. In 1952, he successfully passed the entrance exam for the École Normale Supérieure, where he was ranked first. He completed his diplôme d'études supérieures on "Remarks on Certain Number Systems" and defended it in 1954 under the supervision of Gaston Bachelard. In 1955, he placed second ex aequo in the agrégation de philosophie (national competitive examination for philosophy teachers).

== Naval career ==
He spent the next two years as a naval officer. From 1956 to 1958, he completed his military service as an officer in the French Navy (Marine Nationale) and was involved in the Suez Crisis.

== Academic career ==
Serres taught philosophy from 1958 to 1968 at the University of Clermont-Ferrand. There, he notably associated with Michel Foucault and Jules Vuillemin. At Clermont-Ferrand, Michel Serres regularly exchanged ideas and viewpoints with Michel Foucault on themes that would later take shape in Foucault's book Les Mots et les Choses (The Order of Things).

At the invitation of Foucault, Serres was appointed to University of Paris VIII, where he briefly took part in the Vincennes experiment in 1968–1969. In 1968, he defended his doctoral thesis in literature (doctorat ès lettres) in 1968 from the University of Paris, titled Le Système de Leibniz et ses modèles mathématiques (The Leibniz System and Its Mathematical Models). In 1969, he was appointed professor of History of Science at Paris 1 Panthéon-Sorbonne University. He also taught in the United States, first at Johns Hopkins University in Baltimore, at the invitation of René Girard, then followed him to Stanford University, where he was appointed professor in 1984 and taught for nearly 30 years.

== Later years and death ==
He was elected to the Académie française on March 29, 1990, occupying seat no. 18, previously held by Edgar Faure. He was formally received there on January 31, 1991, by Bertrand Poirot-Delpech.

He died on 1 June 2019, at the age of 88.

== Editorial activities ==
Michel Serres participated in the re-edition of Auguste Comte's Cours of Positive Philosophy in 1975. Later, he created the “Corpus des œuvres de la philosophie en langue française” at Fayard Editions. Launched in 1984 with the support of the Centre national du livre, the collection includes 131 titles in 155 volumes, published between 1984 and 2005. The goal was to gather philosophical writings in the French language from the 16th century to the early 20th century that had not been reissued. The aim was to make known forgotten works by well-known and lesser-known authors who helped build French-language philosophy. The collection highlights the multidisciplinary nature of French-language philosophy, featuring thinkers of all kinds: atheists and abbots, scientists and theologians, progressives and conservatives. Michel Serres emphasized direct access to the texts, without commentaries. Christiane Frémont served as the editor-in-chief of this collection. A journal, Corpus, Revue de Philosophie, accompanied the collection, with 69 issues published from 1985 to 2015.

Following meetings at the Fondation des Treilles and thanks to Sophie Bancquart, Éléments d’histoire des sciences was published by Bordas in 1989. The book contains 22 chapters addressing major questions, such as: Where and when does science appear? How do we assess knowledge? It covers the thought of scholars like Archimedes, Galileo, Descartes, Darwin, Lavoisier, Mendel, or Pasteur, as well as fundamental concepts like refraction, heredity, the evolution of the Earth, vaccinations, relativity, and more.

In 1992, Sophie Bancquart and Nayla Farouki created a pocket encyclopedia series called Dominos at Flammarion. Michel Serres and Nayla Farouki directed the collection, which published 236 titles between 1993 and 2002.

In 1997, he co-directed with Nayla Farouki Le Trésor, encyclopédie et dictionnaire des sciences, to which major French scientists contributed. The initial group, later expanded, included Michel Serres, Sophie Bancquart, Nayla Farouki, Pierre Léna, Étienne Klein, and Albert Jacquard. This work provides an overview of contemporary sciences through contributions from active researchers in various fields of knowledge. Its publication offers an accessible panorama of modern science for everyone.

In the collective work À visage différent, l'alliance thérapeutique autour de l'enfant meurtri, published in 1997, Michel Serres and André-Robert Chancholle edited contributions from about fifteen personalities—psychologists, physicians, surgeons, orthodontists, and others—to address the therapeutic, moral, and social issues faced by parents of a child born with a malformation.

In 1998, Michel Serres co-founded Éditions le Pommier together with his editor at Flammarion, Sophie Bancquart. The goal was to make all fields of scientific and philosophical knowledge and reflection accessible to everyone.

The Book of Medicine, co-directed by Michel Serres and Nayla Farouki, with the collaboration of four physicians (Laurent Degos, Michel Hautecouverture, Didier Jeannin, and Christian Spadone), was published in 2001 by Éditions le Pommier. It includes 400 articles describing the human being from the physician’s perspective: body and mind, illness and health, therapies and research.

== Works and philosophical journey ==
Michel Serres' philosophy is placed under the sign of travel, among theoretical knowledge, objects of the world, and the human city. Inter-references play indefinitely between each of these three dimensions. Consequently, Michel Serres makes communication the condition for knowledge of the totality as a “superposition of non-centered networks.” It is this totality that he wants to explore in his work.

=== A pioneer of structuralism ===
To explore knowledge, Michel Serres discerned, as early as 1960, the importance of the notion of structure, imported from the mathematics of the Bourbaki group: “A structure is an operational set with indefinite meaning, grouping elements in any number, whose content is not specified, and relations, in finite number, whose nature is not specified, but whose function and certain results with respect to the elements are defined.” Michel Serres is undoubtedly the first philosopher to define an explicitly structuralist global program in philosophy, in the manner of Claude Lévi-Strauss in anthropology. Michel Serres named his project: general theory of importation, anchored in analogical thought. Structuralism inaugurated a new era whose method Serres qualified as “loganalysis”: “On a given cultural content, whether it be God, table, or basin, an analysis is structural (and is structural only) when it makes this content appear as a model.” This content is isomorphic to a certain number of other contents. The structure is precisely what is preserved in an isomorphism between two sets. A privileged example is that of Georges Dumézil's three functions. The translation of the language of one region into that of another region is possible beyond scientific regions, the series of models is not limited to scientific knowledge, and one can find a theme already brought out in literature, in political, religious discourse, etc. One then passes from “the cultural formation named science” to the set of cultural formations. Thermodynamics, for example, is not only one of the sciences; it is what is said in all sciences: “The steam engine is no longer only what the natural sciences say (with their energetics), but also Marx with his accumulation of capital, Freud with his primary process, Nietzsche with his will to power and his eternal return, Bergson with his two sources, one hot and the other cold, and again Michelet, Turner's painting, Zola's novels, etc.”

=== The objective transcendental ===
Michel Serres was struck very early on by the exclusive attention paid by philosophers to subjective analysis. He therefore distanced himself from a purely idealist approach to the transcendental (that is, what concerns the conditions of possibility of knowledge), by integrating a materiality that inscribes its conditions of existence in the world. He formulated, as early as 1960, the project of reorienting philosophical analyses toward the object. The “objective transcendental” (transcendental objectif) can be defined by the set of worldly conditions that precede and shape knowledge independently of the subject. It rests on objects of the world and technical artifacts. Instead of being solely a structure imposed by the mind, the transcendental exists in the real world itself. There are regularities, structures, codes inscribed in things themselves, which make universal knowledge possible. These objective structures are present before any human perception and enable the emergence of objective knowledge: “…where solid things, impure or pure, bear inscribed upon them an information that the entire theory contributes to decipher, where they inform one another, as once the atoms of nature expressed themselves to one another. This informal language of inter-objectivity leads us to a philosophy of nature… It is in the variation of the objects of the world, that we can rediscover everywhere the inscription, the exchange, the emission and reception, of this mute logos that is the very enigma in which we are plunged. There truly exists an objective transcendental.” As early as 1972, Michel Serres advanced the idea that producing information was not unique to humans—an idea he revisited in a speech delivered in 2013 to the Académie Française: “There exists information in general that can stabilize in a solid, since every object receives and emits, stores and processes information as well. Thus, all knowledge is a translation by which it is a matter of ‘deciphering the language of objects applied to objects, by reconstructing, when possible, this objective language.’ There exist objects, independent of us. What we can know of them depends on what they tell us.”

=== The collective network ===
Facing the material world of objects, another network exists: that of the human community. Took collectively, humanity constitutes in itself another transcendental field, through the inter-subjectivity it presupposes: “The we belongs properly to all and in common to each; it designates the multicentered network that our arbitrary decisions cut up at will, segment, and mutilate. Therefore, there exists one subject and one only: inter-subjectivity as such.” The individual exists as consciousness only by integrating into or positioning itself within the network formed by the set of individuals. In this, Michel Serres finds a kinship with Leibniz's method, which privileges relation over being. This presupposes a de-centering of the cogito, of the thinking subject: “The path of traditional philosophy, the path of Descartes, that of Kant, that of Husserl, will be, by methodical circumscription, closed for a time. For this philosophy is gravely mistaken in wanting to seek the subject beforehand, as a primary foundation. It is appropriate to seek it afterward. The traditional philosophical method must be completely reversed.”

Faced with the set of discourses and objects, there exists only one transcendental subject: the human collective: “The subject, by itself, is not at the foundation of knowledge, and the transcendental is not in it. Knowledge is nothing without a collective that founds it (...) consciousness is the knowledge whose subject is the community of the we. Communication creates man; he can reduce it, but not suppress it without suppressing himself (...) If there is a subject of thought, he is a messenger for dead knowledge and information, he is an interceptor for the reactivation of information flowing through the network.”

However, a danger lurks if the collectivity ignores objects: “The collectivity knows only itself and gives itself only itself as object, its noise, its relations, its streets and its swamp, its glory, its power, its politics, its hatreds. It feeds on and delights in its clamors, deaf to the noises of the world, blind to its light, insensitive to its calls.” To escape this danger, science allows an optimal communication that creates order, unity in multiplicity, but by reducing things to the status of passive objects. In place of these silent objects, Michel Serres introduced the concept of the quasi-object, taking the example of the rugby ball: “Around the ball, the team fluctuates quickly like a flame, it maintains, around it, through it, a core of organization. It is the sun of the system and the force that passes between its elements, it is centered de-centered, shifted, surpassed, things that exist through their relations and circulation between subjects and objects. […] The object here is a quasi-object insofar as it remains a quasi-us. It is more a contract than a thing, it is more of the horde than of the world.” Neither subjects nor objects, quasi-objects exist only through the relations they weave. Through their circulation, they have the effect of stabilizing relations and objectifying social bonds. Thus, the individual and the collective are inseparable: we are all the product of exchanges and interactions.

=== A new approach to science and knowledge ===
The first part of Michel Serres' work is partly devoted to the philosophy of science. Michel Serres' first published book, derived from his main thesis, studied the work of Leibniz. He proposed a philosophical approach to science in his secondary thesis, titled “Essay on the Epistemological Concept of Interference,” which was published in the second volume of Hermes, in 1972. It involves the simultaneous exploration of the three fields—of knowledge, objects, and humans—privileging the analysis of science in action and techniques, in the idea of an encyclopedia animated by a new scientific spirit: “The most remarkable phenomenon of the new scientific spirit is the collapse of the partition that formerly made the encyclopedia an association of cells. […] the sciences have come to a state that Leibniz described: they form or tend to form a ‘continuous body like an ocean,’ which it is arbitrary to divide [...] The new spirit develops into a philosophy of transport: intersection, intervention, interception. This philosophy speaks of the sciences, but it is not silent on the world they express or institute, on the world of things and the world of men.”

The encyclopedia draws a network of expression between the disciplines of knowledge. But the moving multiplicity of the nodes in a network implies that there is no "queen of the sciences", that is, no reference science, contrary to positivism. Each region of the encyclopedia borrows its concepts from or refers to a multitude of other regions, knowledge thus constituting one of the fundamental networks of the universe. For Michel Serres, the concept of intersection, the analogical approach, and the importation of concepts must open to a non-Bachelardian epistemology. While Michel Serres recognizes the contribution of Gaston Bachelard, he distances himself from the latter by considering that there is no longer a sharp and definitive break from history to physics, from history in general to the history of sciences. From Hermès I (1968) onward, he rises against normative epistemology. While working on the history of mathematics and physics, Serres denounces the disciplinary partitioning of the history of sciences. Science compartmentalized into sectors is in fact constituted through exchanges and translations, thanks to multiple confluences between regions of knowledge: “Everyone talks about the history of sciences. As if it existed. Yet I know of none. I know monographs or associations of monographs with empty intersections. There are histories of sciences, distributively. Of geometry, of algebra, barely of mathematics, of optics, of thermodynamics, of natural history, and so on. […] Everything happens as if it were forbidden to question the classification of sciences into sectors […] Perhaps we should start by writing a critical history of classifications. But history itself is in a class.”

In 1972, he launched a frontal attack on Gaston Bachelard's The Formation of the Scientific Mind, accusing it of seeking to moralize science by purifying it of all sin. And he added in 1974: “There is no pure myth except the knowledge pure of all myth.” All science is impure, because it is mixed with myth, dream, images, ideology. The break with the Bachelardian vision is consummated with the publication in 1977 of The Birth of Physics in the Text of Lucretius, which presented Lucretius's De rerum natura as a scientific work, contrary to its usual reading as a metaphysical poem, thereby casting doubt on the concept of epistemological rupture. Defying borders and demarcations, Serres proposes a reading of De rerum natura aimed at rehabilitating—rather than disqualifying, in the manner of Bachelard—its scientific scope. The Birth of Physics in the Text of Lucretius (1977) demonstrated the coherence of the clinamen hypothesis (a very slight deviation in the trajectory of atoms, according to Lucretius, leads to the first aggregates of atoms and consequently to the genesis of the ordered world) in light of 20th-century fluid dynamics. This book also staged a new figure of time, the vortex or whirlpool in laminar flow, as a singularity inaugurating a new trajectory. From there, Michel Serres opened the way to a new philosophy reconnecting with the humanist horizon through new contemporary models: chaos theory in nuclear physics, catastrophe theory in mathematics, and fractal theory in geometry. Lucretius inspired a wisdom founding human relations with nature not on predation but on harmony and respect for the balances of living things. Michel Serres gradually then attached himself to the study of the senses, of the body as mediator between the external world and the internal world. He privileged multiplicity over unicity, bifurcation rather than dialectical overcoming, mobility rather than invariance, the random rather than necessity, the contingent rather than the general rule, experience rather than formalism.

=== The pioneer of the philosophy of communication ===
Michel Serres was convinced very early on, from the beginning of the 1960s, that the inscription of philosophy in the contemporary world would come from information theory, in reference to Léon Brillouin, to form a philosophy of communication celebrating the victory of Hermes over Prometheus: “Man, henceforth or soon, will live only on messages.”. In his five books devoted to Hermes, the Greek god of merchants and communication, Michel Serres developed a hermeneutics of the impact of science in the contemporary world. The theme of messengers was present in his 1993 book on angels, The Legend of the Angels, which can be read as a metaphor for the role of the philosopher who announces and shows the state of the contemporary world: “Angels have always succeeded in what I have long tried to think: a mixed, flamboyant, rigorous, hermetic and panic, serene and open universe, a philosophy of communication, traversed by networked systems and parasites, and requiring, to found itself, a theory of multiplicities, of chaos, of uproar and noise, before any theory.”.

Michel Serres's reading of Leibniz's Monadology allowed him to ex plain the modern world's enthusiasm for horizontal communication. He retained from Leibniz the two faculties possessed by the individual: will and understanding, that is, the combination between the infinity of possible worlds and the will consisting in choosing among them the best of possible worlds. “Leibniz discovered, and science today confirms, that from combinatorics are born both the individual and time.” Another point of adhesion for Michel Serres to Leibniz is that the method gives prevalence to calculation, which must replace evaluation or opinion: it substitutes for an evident truth the multiplicity of probabilities, of possibilities. He rediscovered with Leibniz procedural thought, that is, the importance of the notion of algorithm.

It is a matter of bringing out the conditions of possibility for successful relations. Michel Serres sought a general structure of communication organized around a diagonal of intersubjectivity: any dialogue between two individuals engages a square of dialogue that constitutes its conditions of possibility, involving a third person, the excluded third without which communication is not possible. A fourth term enters the square at the moment when communication succeeds. The figure of the Parasite represents all kind of obstacles to communication, but, through the bifurcations it implies, the parasite opens onto a symbiotic relation, potentially carrying innovation.

Michel Serres sought a knowledge adapted to the means of modern communication, more horizontal, less hierarchical, not centered around a fixed point, disseminated according to the connections of the network. He gave an ethical and philosophical dimension to this vision of the multiple: he criticized monist and dualist philosophies, which imposed too rigid a vision of the world. He valued a thought of the network, of connection and flow, which allowed understanding diversity without crushing it under an artificial unity.

The relationship to the external world passes through the body, and Michel Serres, as a philosopher of mediations, found in the study of bodily aptitudes a privileged field of research. He proposed a line of thought focused on "mingled bodies", interconnections, and fluidity, refusing fixed separations. Rather than a world structured into distinct categories, he invited us to think of a universe of relations, passages, and hybridizations that rejected the gesture of exclusion (notably between human and non-human). The “philosophy of mingled bodies” invited to think of otherness, where the relationship to the other is always a co-construction and not an opposition. He proposed a reconciliation between knowledge and the sensible, between theory and lived experience. In The Five Senses, Michel Serres proposed a vision where knowledge did not pass solely through abstract reason, but also through bodily and tactile experience. He proposed an alternative to the Western dualism between body and mind. The skin, in particular, is both interface and membrane, capturing touch and the external world, marked by scars, tattoos, and the stories it bears, as Michel Serres saw it in the work of Bonnard. He further developed this line of thought with works on hearing (Music) and on vision (Eyes). In his book Eyes in particular, he reversed the Platonic myth of the cave and suggested taking the starry night, rather than the day, as the model for our knowledge.

=== From the history of science to the anthropology of science ===
For twenty years, from 1969 to 1990, Michel Serres taught History of science in the History department at the Sorbonne University. To the historian of science falls the task of uncovering invariants in each era. Serres identifies them in painting (Carpaccio, Turner...), in literature (Zola, Balzac, La Fontaine, or Molière), or in theater (Corneille). Notably, in Esthétiques sur Carpaccio, Michel Serres, in a poetic language, presents his philosophy as a journey around the wanderings of Hermes through the categories of cartography, topology, and isomorphism, via the semiological analysis of the paintings of Vittore Carpaccio.

Whirlwinds, network nodes—these images sketch a figure of the History of science exposed in the preface to Éléments d’histoire des sciences (1989). In this collective book, it is not a matter of unfolding scientific advances over time, nor of inserting them into a social, cultural, economic, or political framework. Time is not a presupposed framework; a multiplicity of times is invented through their encounters or crossings, and produces a complex cartography that this book attempts to outline: “Far from drawing an aligned sequence of continuous and growing acquisitions or the same sudden sequence of breaks, discoveries, inventions, or revolutions precipitating into oblivion a suddenly obsolete past, the history of the sciences runs and fluctuates over a multiple and complex network of paths that overlap and intersect at nodes, summits, or crossroads, interchanges where two or more ways bifurcate (…) While the sciences are layered, shed, separated or mixed, in a thousand disciplines, and while they constantly change and fluctuate, producing different times, often unpredictable in their advance, what remains relatively invariant in their dazzling and troubled history are the places of convergence and bifurcation where problems are posed and where decisions are made or not made.”

Deeply marked by Hiroshima and the threat of nuclear apocalypse, Serres does not separate sciences and techniques from war and politics. In his eyes, science constitutes an ideal system of rational, universal, exact, rigorous, effective communication. But this self-regulating system no longer has the means to self-control: industrial and military secrets destroy the foundation of scientific rationality, which is optimal communication, and war settles in everywhere. So much so that “the question now is to master mastery, and no longer nature.”

In the 1980s, the history of science practiced by Serres becomes a true anthropology of sciences and technique, introduced in Statues. There, Michel Serres addresses the themes of death, fetish, art, religion, in a series of chapters that begin with a reflection on the explosion of the Challenger shuttle. He seeks to show how our contemporary world results both from Greco-Roman civilization—for example through the sacrificial function of the statue among the Romans—and from technical inventions made toward the end of the 19th century, notably the automobile, through an analysis of the plan of Paris that Michel Serres compares to that of a Roman city, while showing the impact of scientific and artistic discoveries on topography: the Eiffel Tower or Rodin’s Gates of Hell. It is a matter of bringing to light the foundations of rational knowledge that plunge into myth and the sacred. Then, scientific and technical knowledge outlines a relationship of man to the world: it presupposes a division between subject and object. Modern science has reduced things or causes to passive and silent objects lying under the gaze of scholars and made available for the exercise of the will to power or possession by human collectives. This division is redoubled, almost naturalized, by the division between the natural sciences (which speak of the world while avoiding man) and the human sciences (which speak of man while abstracting from the world).

The anthropological approach therefore questions the subject/object and nature/culture dualisms that underpin epistemology: “There is an incessant and continuous dialogue of things among themselves, which forms the historical fabric of events and laws (…) Thus my speech intertwines, in the real fabric of solid things.” Letting things speak, deploying their relations and effects: that is the task of the philosopher who, in a single gesture, describes the birth of the concept, the birth of the social, and the birth of economy in Genèse and in The parasite. The anthropological approach to knowledge is accompanied by a turn toward a narrative style on the part of Michel Serres. He shows that science needs great narratives and the power of myths to mobilize the resources—human and financial—necessary for the always arduous advance of knowledge.

=== The Grand Récit at the service of a new humanism ===
Michel Serres' intellectual journey is marked by a dual reading: that of contemporary science and that of the long history of the sciences. In it, he discerns a synchronic dimension, outlined by universal laws, and a diachronic dimension, which becomes the object of a narrative: thus the history of the Earth, conditioned by these laws but singular in its emergence as a planet, temporally and spatially situated, described by science. He thus distinguishes four nested narratives: those of the Universe, the Earth, life, and the human.

These four narratives form the “Grand Récit” (Great Story/Grand Narrative), in direct opposition to Jean-François Lyotard (La Condition post-moderne, 1979), who declared that grand narratives were definitively dead. According to Michel Serres, the Grand Récit, like the Odyssey, must be tellable to a child as well as to a specialist. This narrative presents itself as a modern cosmogony, answering the universal questions of the first chapter of Genesis: whence come the sky, the Earth, life, and man, male and female? "Through the sciences of the world and of humanity, we finally reconstruct a new grand narrative, one that touches all people and the world in its entirety, offering hope for a decentered humanism, for the first time authentically universal... I call Grand Récit the statement of the contingent circumstances that emerge one after another over a colossal span of time, whose beginning is marked by the birth of the universe and continues with its expansion, the cooling of planets, the appearance of life on Earth, the evolution of living beings as conceived by neo-Darwinism, and that of humanity".

In Michel Serres, the conception and expression of the Grand Récit unfold across a series of four works: Hominescence (2001), L’Incandescent (2003), Rameaux (2004), and Récits d’humanisme (2006). The synthesis occurs in Le Gaucher boiteux (2015). Presenting himself as a descendant of Homer and Darwin, a cousin of Leroi-Gourhan and Jules Verne, the author of the Grand Récit, inspired by Aristotle, takes as his motto: “To know is to remember. And to remember is to know how to tell. To tell is to know.”

A memory that stretches over a unifying temporality, more than thirteen billion years long, marked by incessant contingent bifurcations, emergences of novelties—of which hominization is one among many. The narrative recounts the long beginning of an unfinished history, whose stages the sciences can date. The human sciences are interwoven with those of nature.

Michel Serres vehemently rejected, as a tragic mark of inculture, any fracture between people qualified as “literary” or “scientific.” The Grand Récit must be an act of reconciliation. Michel Serres embarked on a long journey through History by recounting to his readers the “Grand Récit of the Universe.” It begins with the Big Bang and the development of the first forms of life on Earth, continues through the ages and metamorphoses of the world, and finally arrives at the 21st century of Petite Poucette (Thumbelina, Serres' term for the digital-native generation).

In his book Le Gaucher boiteux, Michel Serres delivers a praise of thought and invention by seeking to demonstrate that this “Grand Récit of the Universe” is studded with innovations, bifurcations, and inventions. Thus, like Copernicus and Galileo (who were the first to postulate that it was the Earth that revolved around the Sun, thereby opposing the geocentrism upheld by the Church at the time), Darwin (who was the first to propose a theory of evolution that was strongly criticized in his era), or even Wegener (who was the first in geology to propose the existence of moving tectonic plates), History is the narrative of innovations and multiple bifurcations. Through allegory, Michel Serres highlights that every inventor is a kind of “limping left-hander.” The singular figure of the left-hander, notably discussed in a chronicle of Le Sens de l’Info with Michel Polacco, is a theme dear to the academician, himself a frustrated left-hander. Constantly forced to evolve in a world designed for right-handers, left-handers have, for Michel Serres, great merit: they are born into a kind of instability, they bifurcate and are thus driven to innovate, particularly to better adapt. Serres’ thesis is that any invention requires stepping off the beaten path, a break with conformism. Therefore, the person who invents must necessarily place themselves on the margin, bifurcate, and think for themselves—which translates into this formula from Michel Serres: “To think is to invent, not to imitate or copy!”

=== The natural contract ===
Michel Serres formed friendships in 1970 with Jacques Monod, who shared with him the manuscript of his book Chance and Necessity. He also developed a friendship with François Jacob, thereby discovering biochemistry. From 1990 onward, he turns toward the life and Earth sciences (SVT: Sciences de la Vie et de la Terre). These fields deeply inspire him over the following decades, particularly through his encounter with the biologist Béatrice Salviat, who introduces him to botany and to whom he dedicates Biogée (2010). He believes that “the life and Earth sciences will replace physics, giving birth to a new endeavor that will renew the face of the Earth.” The panorama of the universe is then drawn from the time of the Big Bang up to the evolution of living beings and the emergence of humanity.

One of the major themes that Michel Serres develops across several books (Le Mal propre, Biogée, La Guerre mondiale) is linked to the Natural Contract, published in 1990. Ten years earlier, the philosopher had been invited to Japan for a conference held on the sidelines of the G7, attended by around twenty scientists and intellectuals from around the world, including Jean Dausset (future Nobel Prize in Medicine) and François Gros, who directed the Pasteur Institute. The failure of this meeting, which aimed to reflect on the foundations of a universal ethic, led Serres to question ecological issues through the philosophy of law. He noted that everything that was not the human species was excluded from the 1948 Universal Declaration of Human Rights. Hence his idea of establishing the principle of a new law, not exclusively reserved for the human species. There is no law of nature, he says, without a “natural contract.” Nature, he asserts, must become a subject of law: “The Natural Contract is a work of philosophy of law, since it involves the discovery of a third place from which one can see, at the same time and simultaneously, scientific reason and legal reason, the laws of the physical world and the political laws of human collectives, the rules of Nature and the rules of Contracts.”

In The Natural Contract, and later in Hominescence, Michel Serres develops the notion of world-objects (objets-monde), which accounts for a fundamental shift in our relationship to artifacts and technologies. If, in the past, a technical object was local, limited to a precise function in a given environment, certain objects have today become “world-objects”: large-scale artifacts equivalent in power to the world itself, acting on a planetary scale, such as the Internet, the smartphone, the GPS satellite, nuclear waste, and so on. We inhabit a universe shaped by them. These world-objects redefine our human condition. We are shaped by them as much as we shape them.

In Le Mal propre (Malfeasance: Appropriation Through Pollution?), Serres shows that the history of humanity is marked by a paradoxical freedom: that of polluting in order to mark and appropriate a territory. In this sense, human freedom, understood as possession and expansion, must be called into question. Serres defends a relational freedom: we always depend on networks, flows, and interactions with others and with the world. We are free only insofar as we can exchange, connect, and move—but on the condition of maintaining mastery over our mastery, in recognition of a co-dependence with the entirety of the living and things. Thus, freedom would no longer be a power over others or over nature, but a way of coexisting without appropriation in symbiosis with the living, a practice of harmony with the world, a way of inhabiting without possessing through the natural contract.

As Jean-Marc Drouin emphasizes, the granting of rights to nature, in the perspective of the Natural Contract according to Michel Serres, is designed to limit the right of a few to abuse the common good of all, and to remind each generation of the rights of future generations. Thus, in relation to nature, the question arises of the limits of the right of property, which fits into a political aim.

=== Philosophy and the eradication of evil ===
The paradox in Michel Serres lies in the coexistence of a “political philosophy that redefines the relationship of man with nature, opposing all forms of domination, acting for transmission, education, concerned with deepening participatory democracy, indignant at social inequalities and the impoverishment of the Third World” (and the Fourth World as well), and the rejection of traditional political institutions.

The identification of the fixed-point structure is one of the first major advances in Michel Serres' work, in his inaugural book Le Système de Leibniz et ses modèles mathématiques (1968). He illuminates the notion of a “central point, perspectival site, center of equilibrium and support, origin and reference—for reason, history, conduct, and salvation…” The classical age takes as its primary object of research a fixed point as a reference locus and optimal point of view.

Yet the fixed point is at the origin of violence. Indeed, it is from the fixed point that the third party is excluded. The principle of the excluded third consists in repressing the foreigner, noise, the parasite, in designating the intruder as undesirable, resulting in the establishment of a state of violence. Thanatocracy—“the government of death”—takes the fixed point as its benchmark: the discourse of power models the structure of the fixed point and its work of violence in order to occupy all space. Michel Serres names its driving force the “thanatocratic triangle,” which expresses the union of science (through theoretical innovation), techniques (through industrial serial reproduction), and strategic escalation. This triangle forms the alliance of theory and practice in the service of imperialism, an alliance animated by a calculating, predictive, prospective reason oriented toward an end that is none other than death.

Michel Serres was profoundly marked by the threat of nuclear apocalypse; he often says that it was the explosions of Hiroshima and Nagasaki that gave rise to his philosophy. Michel Serres states that the Enlightenment of the 18th century was extinguished by the flash of those bombs. Science, which was believed to be entirely good, is placed in the service of death. Thus, “knowledge can become a tool of collective destruction.” It is the absence of any assigned finality to science by scientists that makes it deadly, by allowing power to give it one. Michel Serres did not separate sciences and techniques from war and politics. From the very beginning of his work, he focused on the moral problematic of scientific progress and its effects. In his view, science constituted an ideal system of rational, universal, exact, rigorous, and effective communication. But this self-regulating system no longer has the means to self-control: industrial and military secrets destroy the foundation of scientific rationality, which is optimal communication, and war installs itself everywhere. So much so that “the question now is to master mastery, and no longer nature.” How to create an ethics, envision a deontology when science and violence ally themselves?

Michel Serres later developed a philosophy of history in his book Darwin, Bonaparte et le Samaritain: une philosophie de l'histoire (2016). Serres' history is constructed in three ages responding to the three traditional questions of philosophy: Where do we come from? Who are we? Where are we going? In each of these ages, the couples life/death, peace/war, energy/entropy, soft/hard play out in tension. The first age is symbolized by the figure of Darwin: the theory of evolution concerns the long time that provides the generic conditions of our world. The sciences in general have broadened our vision of beginnings to answer the question of our origins, toward the most distant past. Evolutionary biology, astrophysics, and cosmology are the reference sciences. The energy-entropy couple corresponds to the evolution-mutation and selection couple of the first age. The second age is the age of the hard, symbolized by Napoleon: physics, mechanics, and thermodynamics are the major sciences of this time, suited to constructing ever more sophisticated deadly weapons.

The third age is the age of the soft, where the world becomes a new actor and where Life and Earth sciences take the lead. Michel Serres considered that true humanism had only just been born in the contemporary era with the realization of universal man made possible by modern communication technologies. In the humanism that Michel Serres promoted, linked to communication, a major distinction has to be made between identity and belonging. They must not be confused, because projecting belonging onto identity is the source of racism, by reducing an individual to one of their characteristics, physical or social, according to a form of essentialization. Speaking of national identity or sexual identity is a logical error and even, he adds, a political crime. The “identity card” in fact only mentions certain belongings (male or female sex, age group, nation), belongings that multiply and become more complex over time.

Michel Serres thus developed his reflection on topology in Hominescence (2001), where according to the author's thesis “our habitat becomes topology” thanks to the Internet and the mobile phone. The message confuses voice and writing, and the latter places itself in the service of the democratic path through a profound anthropological mutation. Michel Serres defined the human condition by inventing the neologism hominescence, more suited to our era than hominization. With this word, he designated the ongoing mutation, which accelerated in the 20th century, profoundly modifying man—his body, his life, his death, and his relationship to nature. Technological progress has externalized a whole series of manipulations, allowing techniques to become autonomous and evolve independently: “This is what I call exo-Darwinism. Our body, by exteriorizing itself, no longer needs to evolve. […] Thus, through this externalization, cultural time begins, different from vital time, with other rhythms and other tempos.”

Michel Serres saw in technology a new human universal, a possible technological humanism, where it is necessary to rediscover the “mastery of our mastery.” His ideas on technology, already developed in his Cahiers de formation, were set out in Petite Poucette. On March 1, 2011, in a solemn session at the French Academy on the theme “The New Challenges of Education,” Michel Serres delivered the speech “Petite Poucette,” referring to a generation that he explains is experiencing profound mutations and rare transformations in history: “He or she no longer has the same body, the same life expectancy, no longer inhabits the same space, no longer communicates in the same way, no longer perceives the same external world, no longer lives in the same nature; born under epidural and scheduled birth, no longer fears the same death, under palliative care. No longer having the same head as his or her parents, he or she knows differently.” He drew a book from this lecture: Petite Poucette, which has been a huge publishing success with over 270,000 copies sold in France. In this short fable, he described the full range of changes induced by the digital revolution, which affects everything to which the human being was accustomed. This revolution is embodied by a young girl who skillfully taps with her thumbs on the keyboard of her mobile phone. This vision of technology, in a humanist sense, came with a comprehensive educational project. In an interview with Hans Ulrich Obrist, Michel Serres expressed interest in the emergence of a new political philosophy the digital context of the 21st century, "I think that out of this place of no law that is the Internet there will soon emerge a new law, completely different from that which organized our old metric space." Serres was a vocal enthusiast for freely accessible knowledge, especially Wikipedia.

Michel Serres placed great importance on the sharing of knowledge. He theorized questions of education by distinguishing between “élever” (raising/upbringing), “instruire” (instructing), and “éduquer” (educating) in Le Tiers-Instruit (The Troubadour of Knowledge). For Michel Serres, “all learning consists in hybridization/métissage.” His vision of education involvef rethinking the university to ensure the transition from the old world to the new one, and to move from one conception of knowledge to another—richer, accepting plurality: “Dies… the organization in general founded on hierarchy or hierarchical thought as constitutive of order. Together and everywhere appear schemas of self-regulation, networked organisms, multipolar thought, metastable equilibria, the concept of autoregulation. This is true, all at once, in the field of knowledge and in collective action, through encyclopedic research and social existence.”

Michel Serres criticized the authority relationship between master and student and advocates a pedagogy based on listening and dialogue. He asserted that “to speak to someone is first to listen to them” and insisted that the teacher does not hold power over the student, but only over the knowledge he transmits. In this perspective, learning does not rest solely on the transmission of content, but on the teacher’s ability to respond to his audience and adjust his discourse according to the students’ expectations.

=== Philosophy of Education ===
In his works, Michel Serres opposed the conception of fixed knowledge centered on a single reference point. He valued a decentered approach, where knowledge was seen as a constantly evolving network. He proposed a dynamic approach, where education becomes a navigation through different fields of knowledge. Knowledge can only be transversal and interdisciplinary, because everything is networked. It is a matter of circulating knowledge between the hard sciences and the human sciences—what he calls Le Passage du nord-ouest (The Northwest Passage). The exact sciences and the human sciences must intersect to understand the world. Seeking to break down the silos of knowledge, Michel Serres attempted to establish connections, build bridges, and interweave scientific and literary knowledge in order to reconcile two cultures that, for him, are fundamentally one.

The tiers-instruit (the Troubadour of knowledge) is the one who positions himself between several disciplines, between several cultures, without fully belonging to one or the other. He is neither a specialist locked in his field nor an ignoramus, but a passer of knowledge, a mediator capable of connecting different universes: science and literature, philosophy and technology, nature and culture. Evaluation should not sanction errors but value the ability to build bridges between disciplines. The teacher is no longer a master who holds the truth, but a guide, a facilitator who helps weave connections.The tiers-instruit is the figure of reconciliation between literary culture and scientific culture, in the service of innovation. It is not a matter of imitation or mimicry. Even if, at first, humans learn knowledge through imitation and mimicry, once they have the required foundations, they develop personal reflection to express the power of thought.

The educational project appears explicitly in L’Incandescent, under the name of “Common Program for the First Year of Universities.” This educational project relies largely on the notion of the Grand Récit. Michel Serres insists on the primacy of ecological concerns and suggests giving priority to the life and Earth sciences (SVT), hitherto considered relatively secondary.

This concern for sharing through education brings him close to the educational program La main à la pâte (“Hands-on”), initiated by Georges Charpak in 1995.

=== Religion: Rereading What is Bound Together ===
Michel Serres completed his oeuvre shortly before his death with a book on religion, Relire le relié (2019; translated as Religion: Rereading What Is Bound Together). Michel Serres’ relationship to Christianity was complex. He explicitly rejected the “Gaia hypothesis.” His mystical position, which advocated self-effacement, was inspired by that of Simone Weil: “It is precisely because man is nothing that it is of the utmost urgent necessity to consider him as the only eminent, sacred being, worthy of being (…) That God creates only because He is love—nothing more profound has perhaps been said about human relations. Knowing lucidly and with despair that I am nothing, I think to find being in the other. And thereby, I give being to him, and to myself.”

According to him, the Christian era marked a great rupture by transforming the message into the messenger through the metamorphosis of the Word into flesh, instituting an unstable in-between between the real and the virtual: “Christianity never ceases to announce the extraordinary phenomena with which this intermediate space-time abounds, when communication there becomes communion.” It is this intermediate space-time that makes the link; it is the unstable framework of communication between the subject, the object, and quasi-objects. Hence the importance of what makes connection: bridges, doors, ports, ... which combine open systems and closed systems.

The last words of his philosophy form a prayer, a supplication, so that humanity may finally deliver itself from evil, in the hope of setting out on a path (possible?) toward holiness, through words and above all through actions.

== Writing style ==
The style in which Michel Serres expresses himself is carefully crafted, faithful to the spirit of French-language philosophy. The reflection started by Michel Serres on the sciences, their history, and their impact leads the philosopher to conceive his writing and his thought as various projections, displacements, and transpositions from the scientific domain to the literary domain. He can bring together in a single paragraph a scientific allusion, a reference to Greco-Roman Antiquity (Hermes is one example), the etymology of a word, a notion forged by the philosopher from Greek or Latin roots—for example, “hominescence,” constructed from the Latin homo and the suffix “-escence,” which denotes a process (as in words like incandescence: the act of emitting heat; luminescence: the act of emitting light; phosphorescence; adolescence; etc.)—to describe a new age of humanity, a new humankind that creates itself through technology, a new body in the face of death and pain, and a new relationship to nature. The choice of a refined, sometimes difficult and metaphorical vocabulary rests on a desire to transpose mathematical or physical theories, which, in the philosopher’s eyes, allow us to transform and illuminate our world. Michel Serres’ writing became lighter over time. He clarified his thought through numerous conferences around the world and various media appearances.

== Relation with other philosophers ==
Michel Serres entered philosophy through the reading of Simone Weil, philosopher and mystic. He takes up dialogues of Plato and inserts them into his own reflection—the Symposium in The Parasite, the Meno in The Origins of Geometry, etc. His encounter with Leibniz was decisive, first because it allows him to set aside the obligatory reference to Descartes; to method, Serres has always preferred exodus. Second, because he sees in Leibniz the one who anticipated his own theory of communication and networks.

Unlike the French philosophical tradition of the 19th century and part of the 20th, Serres did not succumb to the charms of German philosophy, privileging instead philosophy in the French language. He thus exhumed, in what he calls “the Corpus,” an entire tradition that university teaching had neglected. He fit into a lineage of writer-philosophers who combined philosophical thought with literary expression, such as Montaigne, Pascal, Rousseau, and Bergson. From the philosophers who preceded him, what Michel Serres retains are more conceptual characters, to borrow Deleuze’s expression—that is, narratives—than conceptual analyses, as evidenced by Pantopie, a book of interviews between Michel Serres and Martin Legros and Sven Ortoli, journalists at Philosophies Magazine. This book, published in February 2014, recapitulated his entire oeuvre, painting the portrait of a man who experienced war and lived through—and anticipated—the great revolutions of the 20th century.

Michel Serres acknowledged the profound influence that René Girard exerted on him. To Sartre and Merleau-Ponty he reproached the abstraction of their thought and their ignorance of the real world and the science of their time. He did not appreciate Althusser for of his Zhdanovism. With Michel Foucault one can speak of a disappointed friendship after the months spent in Clermont-Ferrand, where exchanges between the two young philosophers were frequent. It is undoubtedly Gilles Deleuze with whom Michel Serres felt closest, and to whom he paid tribute several times—an effect of their common admiration for Leibniz.

His philosophy, sometimes criticized for its naiveté, its scientism, or its approximations, is profoundly optimistic. Born in the tragedy of war and the flash of Hiroshima, it sees emerging, in the current anthropological and technological revolution, the promise of an “homo universalis”: “I have no hope, I am of a tragic optimism, but I have a great deal of hope.”

== Forums ==
The Rencontres Michel Serres consist of a series of conferences on themes inspired by the work of Michel Serres. They have been held since 2021 in Agen (Théâtre Ducourneau) every year. In 2023, the theme was artificial intelligence around the book Petite Poucette. In 2024, the conferences focused on the theme of peace.

In 2017, he talked to Italian-French philosopher Robert Maggiori and Monegasque, French-language author Charlotte Casiraghi about "the traveling philosopher" (Le philosophe voyageur) in a conference for Les Rencontres Philosophiques de Monaco. The interview is published in the revue Le Cahier no.2.

== Honours and recognition ==
In 1990, Serres was elected to the Académie française in recognition of his position as one of France's most prominent intellectuals.

In 2012, Serres was awarded the Meister Eckhart Prize, and in 2013 he was awarded the Dan David Prize.

== Publications ==
- 1968: Le Système de Leibniz et ses modèles mathématiques, Presses universitaires de France, rééd. 1982 / "Leibniz System and its mathematical models" (2024), Birkhauser.
- 1969: Hermès I, la communication, Éditions de Minuit, reprint. 1984 / Hermes I, Communication, English translation by Louise Burchill and Paul A. Harris, University of Minnesota Press, 2023.
- 1972: Hermès II, l'interférence, Éditions de Minuit (Hermes II, Interference, (2025), University of Minnesota Press, (English translation by Randolph Burks)
- 1974: Hermès III, la traduction, Éditions de Minuit / "Hermes III, Translation" (2026), University of Minnesota Press.
- 1974: Jouvences. Sur Jules Verne, Éditions de Minuit
- 1975: Auguste Comte. Leçons de philosophie positive, (in collaboration), tome I, Éditions Hermann
- 1975: Esthétiques sur Carpaccio, Hermann
- 1975: Feux et signaux de brume. Zola, Grasset, ISBN 2-246-00258-3
- 1977: Hermès IV, La distribution, Éditions de Minuit, reprint. 1981
- 1977: La Naissance de la physique dans le texte de Lucrèce, Éditions de Minuit / "The birth of physics" (2018) Rowman & Littlefield International, London.
- 1980: Hermès V, Le passage du Nord-ouest, Éditions de Minuit, Paris
- 1980: Le Parasite, Grasset / "The parasite" (2013), Trans. by Lawrence R. Scher, University of Minnesota Press.
- 1982: Genèse, Grasset / "Genesis" (1995), Trans. by Genevieve James and James Nielson, The University of Michigan Press, Ann Arbor.
- 1982: Hermes: Literature, Science, Philosophy, Johns Hopkins University Press, Baltimore and London.
- 1983: Détachement, Flammarion / "Detachment" (1989), Ohio University Press, Athens.
- 1983: Rome. Le livre des fondations, Grasset / "Rome : the first book of foundations" (2020), Randolph Burks (Trans.) Bloomsbury Academic, London.
- 1985: Les Cinq Sens, Grasset; reprint. Fayard, 2014 / "The five senses : a philosophy of mingled bodies" (2018), Trans. by Margaret Sankey and Peter Cowley, Bloomsbury Academic.
- 1987: L'Hermaphrodite, Flammarion
- 1987: Statues, François Bourin / Statues : the second book of foundations, Randolph Burks, Bloomsbury, London, 2015.
- 1989: Éléments d'histoire des sciences, (in collaboration), Bordas / "A History of scientific thought" (1995), Blackwell Reference, Oxford.
- 1990: Le Contrat naturel, François Bourin, Paris / The Natural Contract (1995), University of Michigan Press (Trans. by Elizabeth MacArthur and William Paulson)
- 1991: Le Tiers-instruit, François Bourin / "The troubadour of knowledge", University of Michigan Press, Ann Arbor, 2008
- 1991: Discours de réception de Michel Serres à l'Académie française et réponse de Bertrand Poirot-Delpech, François Bourin
- 1992: Éclaircissements, (interviews with Bruno Latour), Éditions François Bourin / "Conversations on science, culture and time (2011), University of Michigan Press, Ann Arbor.
- 1993: La Légende des Anges, Flammarion / "Angels: a modern myth" (1995), Flammarion.
- 1993: Les Origines de la géométrie, Flammarion / "Geometry : the third book of foundations" (2017), Bloomsbury Academic.
- 1994: Atlas, Julliard
- 1995: Éloge de la philosophie en langue française, Fayard
- 1997: Nouvelles du monde, Flammarion
- 1997: Le trésor. Dictionnaire des sciences, (in collaboration), Flammarion, Paris
- 1997: À visage différent, (in collaboration), Hermann
- 1999: Paysages des sciences, (in collaboration), Le Pommier
- 1999: "Variations sur le corps", Le Pommier / "Variations on the Body" (2015) Randolph Burks (trans.), University of Minnesota Press.
- 2000: Hergé, mon ami, Éditions Moulinsart
- 2001: Hominescence, Le Pommier / "Hominescence", Randolph Burks (Trans.), Bloomsbury Academic, London, 2019
- 2003: L'Incandescent, Le Pommier / "The incandescent" (2018), Randolph Burks (Trans.), Bloomsbury Academic.
- 2003: Jules Verne, la science et l'homme contemporain, Le Pommier
- 2004: Rameaux, Le Pommier / "Branches A Philosophy of Time, Event and Advent" (2020), Bloomsbury Academic.
- 2006: Petites chroniques du dimanche soir, Le Pommier
- 2006: L'Art des ponts : homo pontifex, Le Pommier
- 2006: "Récits d'Humanisme", Paris, Le Pommier / "Humanistic narratives" (2025), Bloomsbury (trans. Randolph Burks).
- 2007: Le Tragique et la Pitié. Discours de réception de René Girard à l'Académie française et réponse de Michel Serres, Le Pommier
- 2007: Petites chroniques du dimanche soir 2, Paris, Le Pommier
- 2007: Carpaccio, les esclaves libérés, Le Pommier
- 2008: Le Mal propre : polluer pour s'approprier ?, Le Pommier, coll. « Manifestes » / Malfeasance: Appropriation through Pollution (2011) Stanford University Press (English translation by Anne-Marie Feenberg-Dixon))
- 2008: La Guerre mondiale, Le Pommier
- 2009: Écrivains, savants et philosophes font le tour du monde, Le Pommier, coll. « Les Essais » / "Around the world with writers, scientists and philosophers" (2022) Gazebo Books, Summer Hill, New South Wales.
- 2009: Temps des crises, Le Pommier, coll. « Manifestes » / "Times of crisis : what the financial crisis revealed and how to reinvent our lives and future" (2015), Bloomsbury Academic, New York. ISBN 978-2746505926
- 2009: Van Cleef et Arpels, Le Temps poétique, with Franco Cologni and Jean-Claude Sabrier, Cercle d'Art, coll. « La collection » / "Van Cleff & Arpels : the poetry of time" (2009), Cercle d'Art, Paris.
- 2009: Petites chroniques du dimanche soir 3, Le Pommier
- 2010: Biogée, Éditions-dialogues.fr/Le Pommier / Biogea (2015), University of Minnesota Press, (trans. by Randolph Burks)
- 2011: Musique, Éditions Le PommierISBN 978-2746505452
- 2012: Petite Poucette, Éditions Le Pommier / Thumbelina : the culture and technology of millennials; translated [from the French] by Daniel W. Smith Éditeur: Rowman & Littlefield International, London, 2015.ISBN 978-2746506053
- 2012: Andromaque, veuve noire, Éditions de l’Heren
- 2013: Les Temps nouveaux (coffret), Le Pommier
- 2014: Pantopie, de Hermès à Petite Poucette (avec Martin Legros et Sven Ortoli), Le Pommier
- 2014: Petites Chroniques du dimanche tome VI, Le Pommier
- 2014: Yeux, Le Pommier / "Eyes" (2016), Anne-Marie Feenberg-Dibon (Trans.), Bloomsbury, London.ISBN 978-2746507791
- 2015: Le gaucher boiteux : puissance de la pensée, Le Pommier
- 2015: Écrivains, savants et philosophes font le tour du monde, Le Pommier / "Around the world with writers, scientists and philosophers" (2022), Gazebo Books, Summer Hill, New South Wales.
- 2015: Du bonheur, aujourd'hui (with Michel Polacco), Le Pommier
- 2015: Solitude. Dialogue sur l'engagement (with Jean-François Serres), Le Pommier
- 2016: De l'impertinence, aujourd'hui (with Michel Polacco), Le Pommier
- 2016 : Darwin, Bonaparte et le Samaritain : une philosophie de l'histoire, Paris, Le Pommier
- 2017 : De l'Amitié, aujourd'hui (avec Michel Polacco), Paris, Le Pommier
- 2017 : C'était mieux avant !, Paris, Le Pommier
- 2018 : Défense et illustration de la langue française aujourd'hui, (avec Michel Polacco), Paris, Le Pommier
- 2019 : Morales espiègles, Paris, Le Pommier
- 2019 : "Relire le relié", Paris, le Pommier / "Religion : rereading what is bound together" (2022), M. B. DeBevoise (Translator), Stanford University Press, Stanford, California.
- 2020: "Mes profs de gym m'ont appris à penser", Le Cherche-midi.
- 2020: Adichats ! (Adieu!), Paris, Le Pommier
- 2021: "La Fontaine" (inachevé), Paris, Le Pommier
- 2022: Oeuvres complètes T1: cahiers de formation, Paris, Le Pommier.
