= Susan Wallace (disambiguation) =

Susan Wallace may refer to:

- Susan Wallace (1830–1907), American author and poet
- Susan S. Wallace, American biophysicist and molecular biologist
- Susan Wallace (bishop), New Zealand Māori Anglican bishop
