= John L. Magee (chemist) =

American chemist

John Lafayette Magee
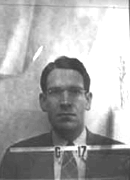
- Born: October 28, 1914; Franklinton, Louisiana, US
- Died: December 16, 2005 (aged 91); Moraga, California, US
- Education: Mississippi College; Vanderbilt University; University of Wisconsin–Madison
- Known for: Samuel-Magee model
- Scientific career
- Fields: Chemical kinetics Radiation chemistry Radiobiology
- Workplaces: Argonne National Laboratory; Los Alamos National Laboratory; University of Notre Dame; Lawrence Berkeley National Laboratory
- Doctoral advisor: Farrington Daniels
- Other academic advisors: Henry Eyring

John Lafayette Magee (October 28, 1914 – December 16, 2005) was an American chemist known for his work on kinetic models of radiation chemistry, especially the Samuel-Magee model for describing radiolysis in solution.

== Education and career ==
Magee obtained his A.B. at Mississippi College in 1935, M.S. at Vanderbilt University in 1936, and his Ph.D. in chemistry at University of Wisconsin in 1939, under the supervision of Farrington Daniels. He then worked with Henry Eyring at Princeton University during his postdoctoral research. Between 1943 and 1946, he worked at the Los Alamos National Laboratory on the Manhattan Project. Afterwards, he moved to Argonne National Laboratory. In 1948, he joined the Department of Chemistry at University of Notre Dame at the invitation of Milton Burton and became a full professor in 1953. He became the director of the Radiation Laboratory at Notre Dame between 1971 and 1975. He moved to Lawrence Berkeley National Laboratory afterwards, conducting research on the biological effects of ionizing radiation. He retired from Berkeley in 1986.

Magee was elected president of the Radiation Research Society for the year 1967, and he became a fellow of the American Physical Society in 1976.

== Bibliography ==
=== Paper series ===
- Magee, John L. (1951). "Theory of Radiation Chemistry. I. Some Effects of Variation in Ionization Density 1,2". Journal of the American Chemical Society. 73 (7): 3270–3275. Bibcode:1951JAChS..73.3270M. doi:10.1021/ja01151a082. ISSN 0002-7863.
- Samuel, Aryeh H.; Magee, John L. (1953). "Theory of Radiation Chemistry. II. Track Effects in Radiolysis of Water". The Journal of Chemical Physics. 21 (6): 1080–1087. Bibcode:1953JChPh..21.1080S. doi:10.1063/1.1699113. ISSN 0021-9606.
- Ganguly, A. K.; Magee, J. L. (1956). "Theory of Radiation Chemistry. III. Radical Reaction Mechanism in the Tracks of Ionizing Radiations". The Journal of Chemical Physics. 25 (1): 129–134. Bibcode:1956JChPh..25..129G. doi:10.1063/1.1742803. ISSN 0021-9606.
- Monchick, L.; Magee, J. L.; Samuel, A. H. (1957). "Theory of Radiation Chemistry. IV. Chemical Reactions in the General Track Composed of N Particles". The Journal of Chemical Physics. 26 (4): 935–941. Bibcode:1957JChPh..26..935M. doi:10.1063/1.1743438. ISSN 0021-9606.
- Mozumder, A.; Magee, J. L. (1966). "Theory of Radiation Chemistry. VII. Structure and Reactions in Low LET Tracks". The Journal of Chemical Physics. 45 (9): 3332–3341. Bibcode:1966JChPh..45.3332M. doi:10.1063/1.1728111. ISSN 0021-9606.
- Mozumder, A.; Magee, J. L. (1967). "Theory of Radiation Chemistry. VIII. Ionization of Nonpolar Liquids by Radiation in the Absence of External Electric Field". The Journal of Chemical Physics. 47 (3): 939–945. Bibcode:1967JChPh..47..939M. doi:10.1063/1.1712059. ISSN 0021-9606.
- Mozumder, A.; Chatterjee, A.; Magee, J. L. (1968). "Theory of Radiation Chemistry. IX. Model and Structure of Heavy Particle Tracks in Water". In Hart, Edwin J. (ed.). Radiation Chemistry. Advances in Chemistry. Vol. 81. WASHINGTON, D. C.: AMERICAN CHEMICAL SOCIETY. pp. 27–48. doi:10.1021/ba-1968-0081.ch002. ISBN 978-0-8412-0082-1.

=== Reviews ===
- Burton, Milton; Magee, John L. (1956). "Einige chemische Aspekte der Strahlenbiologie". Die Naturwissenschaften (in German). 43 (19): 433–442. Bibcode:1956NW.....43..433B. doi:10.1007/BF00629502. ISSN 0028-1042. S2CID 27429912.
- Magee, J L (1961). "Radiation Chemistry". Annual Review of Physical Chemistry. 12 (1): 389–410. Bibcode:1961ARPC...12..389M. doi:10.1146/annurev.pc.12.100161.002133. ISSN 0066-426X.
- Mozumder, A.; Magee, John L. (1975-04-01). "The early events of radiation chemistry". International Journal for Radiation Physics and Chemistry. 7 (2): 83–93. Bibcode:1975IJRPC...7...83M. doi:10.1016/0020-7055(75)90052-2. ISSN 0020-7055.
- Magee, John L. (1990-09-01). "Nonhomogeneous processes in radiation research: Radical diffusion models". Canadian Journal of Physics. 68 (9): 853–857. Bibcode:1990CaJPh..68..853M. doi:10.1139/p90-123. ISSN 0008-4204.

=== Books ===
- Landshoff, Rolf K. M.; Magee, John L., eds. (1969). Thermal Radiation Phenomena. doi:10.1007/978-1-4684-8709-1. ISBN 978-1-4684-8711-4.

== See also ==
- Milton Burton
- Spur (chemistry)
