= Kettering Prize =

Scientific prize for cancer research

The Charles F. Kettering Prize, known often as simply the Kettering Prize, was a US$250,000 award given by the General Motors Cancer Research Foundation for the most outstanding recent contribution to the diagnosis or treatment of cancer.

== History ==
The award was named in honor of Charles F. Kettering, inventor, former General Motors Director, and pioneer of the General Motors Research Laboratories. It was awarded annually from 1979 to 2005.

In 2006, due to budget constraints, the Alfred P. Sloan Jr. Prize, the Charles F. Kettering prize and the Charles S. Mott Prize, originally each worth $250,000, were consolidated into a single General Motors Cancer Research Award with a combined value of $250,000. The first and only winner of the General Motors Cancer Research Award was Napoleone Ferrara. Since 2006 no more prizes have been awarded.

== Medalists ==
- 2005 Angela H. Brodie
- 2004 Robert S. Langer
- 2003 V. Craig Jordan
- 2002 Brian J. Druker and Nicholas B. Lydon
- 2001 David E. Kuhl and Michael E. Phelps
- 2000 Monroe E. Wall and Mansukh C. Wani
- 1999 Ronald Levy
- 1998 H. Rodney Withers
- 1997 Herman D. Suit
- 1996 Malcolm Bagshaw and Patrick C. Walsh
- 1995 Norbert Brock
- 1994 Laurent Degos and Zhen-yi Wang
- 1993 Gianni Bonadonna and Bernard Fisher
- 1992 Lawrence H. Einhorn
- 1991 Victor Ling
- 1990 David Cox
- 1989 Mortimer M. Elkind
- 1988 Sam Shapiro and Philip Strax
- 1987 Basil I. Hirschowitz
- 1986 Donald Pinkel
- 1985 Paul C. Lauterbur
- 1984 Barnett Rosenberg
- 1983 Emil Frei III and Emil J. Freireich
- 1982 Howard E. Skipper
- 1981 E. Donnall Thomas
- 1980 Elwood V. Jensen
- 1979 Henry S. Kaplan

== See also ==
- List of biomedical science awards
