= Austin M. Brues =

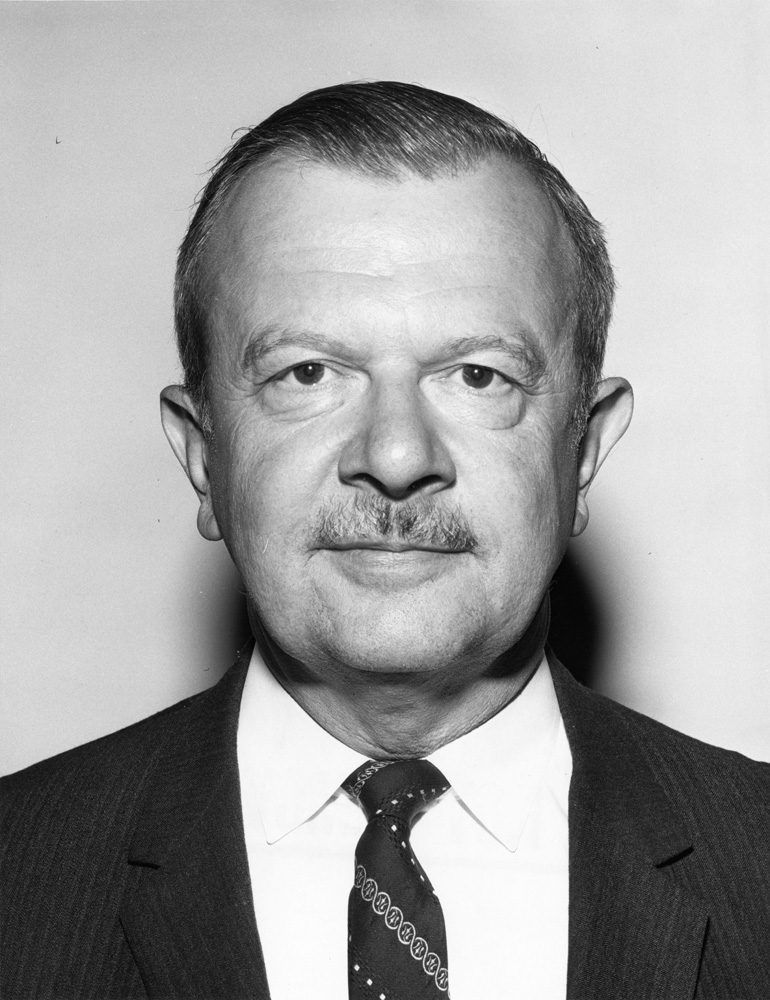
- Born: Austin Moore Brues; April 25, 1906; Milwaukee, Wisconsin, U.S.
- Died: February 27, 1991 (aged 84); Hinsdale, Illinois, U.S.
- Education: Harvard College; Harvard Medical School
- Spouse: Mildred Paulina Carter (m. 1930)
- Scientific career
- Fields: Radiobiology
- Workplaces: Harvard University; Metallurgical Laboratory; University of Chicago; Argonne National Laboratory

Austin Moore Brues (April 25, 1906 – February 27, 1991) was an American pioneer of radiation biology.

== Biography ==
Austin Moore Brues was born April 25, 1906, in Milwaukee, Wisconsin and was educated at the Roxbury Latin School in Boston, Massachusetts. Brues attended Harvard College, graduating with a bachelor's degree in 1926. He then studied at Harvard Medical School, receiving an M.D. in 1930. That same year he married Mildred Carter and began working as an assistant professor at Harvard, becoming an associate professor in 1936.

From 1944 to 1946 Brues was senior biologist at the Metallurgical Laboratory in Chicago, part of the Manhattan Project to develop the atomic bomb. In 1945 he signed the Szilárd petition, calling on President Truman to make public the full terms of Japan's surrender before dropping the atomic bomb.

In 1945, Brues also became a professor of medicine at the University of Chicago, a position he held until his retirement in 1979, when he was appointed professor emeritus. In 1946 Brues became a member of the Atomic Bomb Casualty Commission studying the effects of radiation on the survivors of the Hiroshima and Nagasaki bombings. From 1946 until 1971 Brues was the senior biologist at Argonne National Laboratory. Brues was the president of the Radiation Research Society between 1955 and 1956.

Brues died February 27, 1991, at his home in Hinsdale, Illinois, from Alzheimer's disease.
