= Arthur C. Upton =

American radiation biologist (1923-2015)

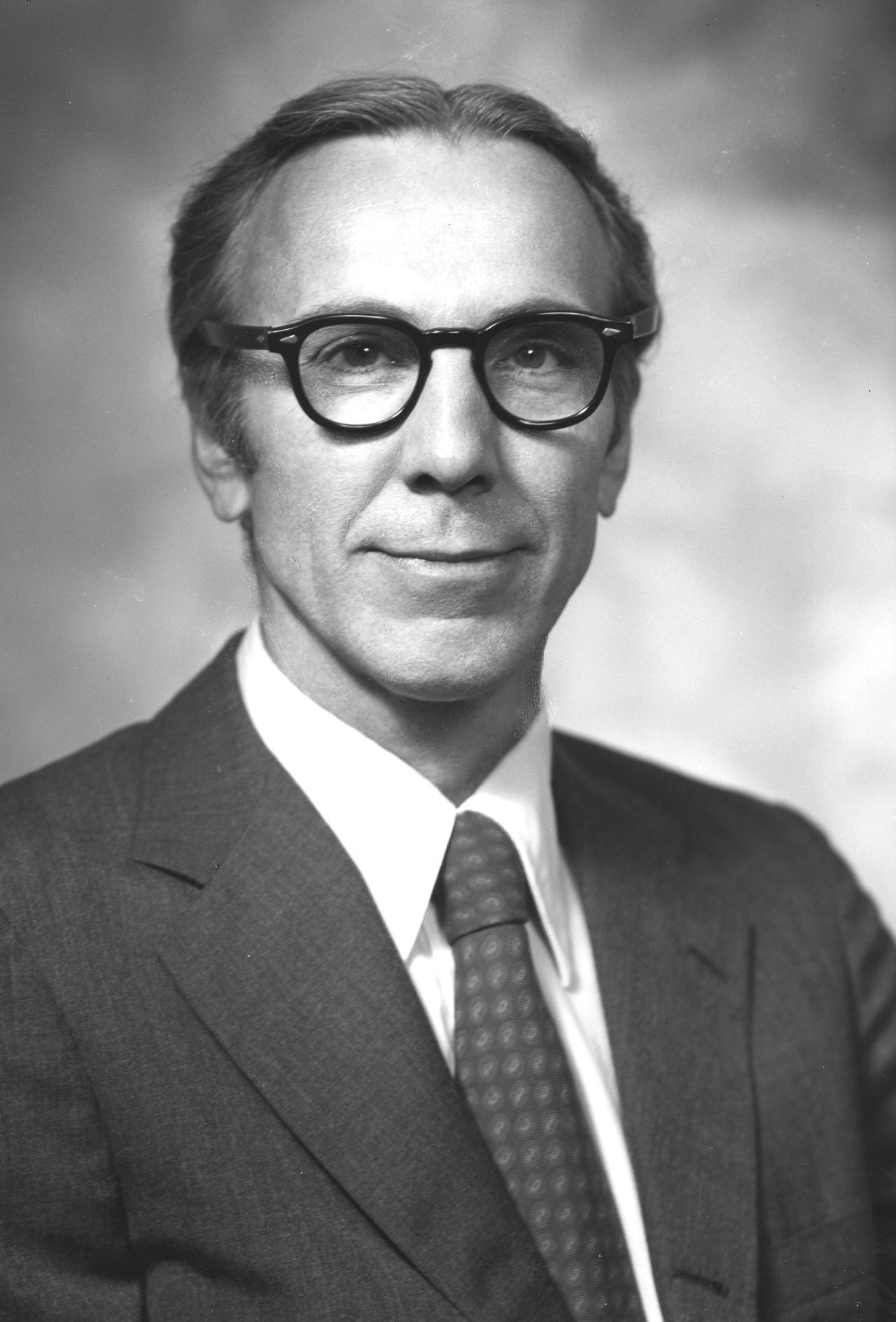
Arthur C. Upton

Arthur Canfield Upton (February 27, 1923 – February 14, 2015) was an American pathologist and radiation biologist. He was former director of the National Cancer Institute and known for his research in radiation biology of cancer.

== Education and career ==
Upton was born in Ann Arbor, Michigan. His interest in medicine was ignited after seeing his mother recover from pneumonia. He studied at Phillips Academy in Andover, Massachusetts. Upton obtained his Bachelor's degree from University of Michigan and his MD from the University of Michigan Medical School in 1946. He completed his residency in 1949 in Michigan. From 1951 to 1954, Upton worked as a pathologist at the Oak Ridge National Laboratory (ORNL). He was the Chief of the Pathology-Physiology Section of the Biology Division of the ORNL from 1954 to 1969. Afterwards, Upton was professor of pathology at Stony Brook University from 1969 to 1977. He was the dean of the School of Basic Health Sciences at Stony Brook University from 1970 to 1975. Between 1965 and 1966, he was the president of the Radiation Research Society.

In 1977, President Jimmy Carter appointed Upton as the director of the National Cancer Institute, who stayed until 1980. He moved to New York University School of Medicine in 1980 and became the Director of the Institute of Environmental Medicine from 1980 to 1992. He then moved to University of New Mexico and became a clinical professor of pathology and radiology from 1992 to 1995.

== Bibliography ==
- Mettler, Jr, Fred A.; Upton, Arthur C. (2008). Medical Effects of Ionizing Radiation (3rd ed.). Saunders. ISBN 9780721602004.
