= Spur (chemistry) =

A spur or track in radiation chemistry is a region of high concentration of chemical products after ionizing radiation passes through. The spur model, proposed by Samuel and Magee in 1953, describes the kinetic behavior of reaction spurs involving one type of radicals in a diffusion-driven environment. The spurs from gamma rays or X-rays are considered to be spherical, while those from alpha particles are cylindrical, also called tracks.

== See also ==
- Linear energy transfer
- Radiobiology
