= Raymond E. Zirkle =

American biologist (1902–1988)

- Born: Raymond Elliot Zirkle; January 9, 1902; Springfield, Illinois, U.S.
- Died: March 4, 1988 (aged 86); Castle Rock, Colorado, U.S.
- Education: University of Missouri (A.B., Ph.D.)
- Spouse: Mary Evelyn Ramsey (m. 1924)
- Children: 2
- Scientific career
- Fields: Radiation biology
- Workplaces: University of Pennsylvania; Bryn Mawr College; University of Indiana; University of Chicago
- Thesis: Some effects of alpha radiation upon plant cells (1932)
- Doctoral advisor: Lewis Stadler
- Doctoral students: Edwin W. Taylor

Raymond Elliot Zirkle (January 9, 1902 – March 4, 1988) was an American biologist who was a pioneer in the field of radiation biology, and served as director of the Institute of Radio-Biology and Biophysics at the University of Chicago, Damon Runyon Fellow. Zirkle was elected to the National Academy of Sciences in 1959.

== Biography ==
=== Early life and education ===
Raymond Elliott Zirkle was born January 9, 1902, in Springfield, Illinois. His childhood was spent in northern Oklahoma and southern Missouri. He attended West Plains High School in West Plains, Missouri.

After graduating high school he joined the Missouri National Guard and in 1924 married Mary Evelyn Ramsey. They went on to have two children together.

Zirkle attended the University of Missouri and received a bachelor's degree in 1928 and a Ph.D. in 1932. His doctoral research involved irradiating spores of the fern Pteris longifolia with alpha particles from a polonium source.

=== Career ===
Zirkle then took a job in medical research at the University of Pennsylvania, where he was a lecturer in biophysics until 1938. His research continued to involve observing the biological effects of alpha radiation on fern spores. From 1938 to 1940 he was an assistant professor of biology at Bryn Mawr College. In 1940 he was appointed as a professor of biology at the Indiana University.

During the Second World War he was recruited to the Manhattan Project as one of the principal investigators in the biological research program. His research involved comparing the biological effects of gamma radiation, beta radiation and neutron radiation and assessing the severity of the risks faced by those working with radioactive materials.

In 1944 he accepted a professorship at the University of Chicago, where he was to be based for the rest of his career. In 1945 he became director of the university's Institute of Radiobiology and Biophysics.

Zirkle developed mathematical models for predicting the survival rates of simple organisms, such as yeast, exposed to varying levels of radiation. In 1951–1952 he work with pathologist William Bloom used a microbeam of ionizing radiation to irradiate parts of living cells and using time-lapse photography to document the effects. Zirkle was the first president of the Radiation Research Society between 1952 and 1953.

=== Later life ===
Zirkle retired from the University of Chicago in the mid-1970s and moved with his wife to Colorado. He died March 4, 1988, at the age of 86 in Castle Rock, Colorado.
