= Milton Burton =

American chemist

- Born: March 4, 1902; Stapleton, New York, USA
- Died: November 10, 1985 (aged 83); Mishawaka, Indiana, USA
- Education: New York University
- Scientific career
- Institutions: New York University; University of Chicago; University of Notre Dame
- Doctoral advisor: Francis Owen Rice

Milton Burton (March 4, 1902 – November 10, 1985) was an American chemist, a pioneer in the field of radiation chemistry and radiobiology. He founded the Radiation Laboratory at University of Notre Dame in 1949 and served as its director from 1963 to 1971. He proposed the G value for describing the chemical yield in radiolytic reactions. He is often referred to as the godfather of radiation chemistry.

== Education and career ==
Burton studied at New York University, obtaining his B.S. in 1922, M.S. in 1923 and Ph.D. in physical chemistry in 1925, supervised by Francis Owen Rice. The textbook he cowrote with Gerhard K. Rollefson, Photochemistry and The Mechanism Of Chemical Reactions, first published in 1939, was an influential work for a generation of scientists and one of the first to integrate quantum mechanics into the description of photochemistry. After working for a decade in the industry, Burton joined the faculty at New York University in 1935. He took part in the Manhattan Project between 1942 and 1943 while working at the Metallurgical Laboratory, at the time headed by Arthur Compton, at the University of Chicago. He joined the faculty of the department of chemistry at University of Notre Dame in 1945 and remained until his retirement in 1971.

Burton helped found the Radiation Research Society in 1952 as the most influential representative on the chemistry side.

== Bibliography ==
- Rollefson, G. K; Burton, Milton (1939). Photochemistry and the mechanism of chemical reactions. New York: Prentice-Hall. OCLC 5988145.
- Burton, Milton; U.S. Atomic Energy Commission; University of Notre Dame (1950). Elementary chemical processes in radiobiological reactions. Oak Ridge, Tenn.: United States Atomic Energy Commission, Technical Information Service. OCLC 795006006.
- Burton, Milton (1960). Comparative effects of radiation. New York: Wiley. OCLC 1131564779.
- Burton, Milton (1963). "Energie-"Dissipation" in der Strahlenchemie". Energie-"Dissipation" in der Strahlenchemie. Mehrzentren-Termination (in German). Wiesbaden: VS Verlag für Sozialwissenschaften. pp. 7–26. doi:10.1007/978-3-663-02396-8_1. ISBN 978-3-663-00483-7.

== See also ==
- Douglas Lea
- John L. Magee
