= Rebecca Abergel =

French inorganic chemist

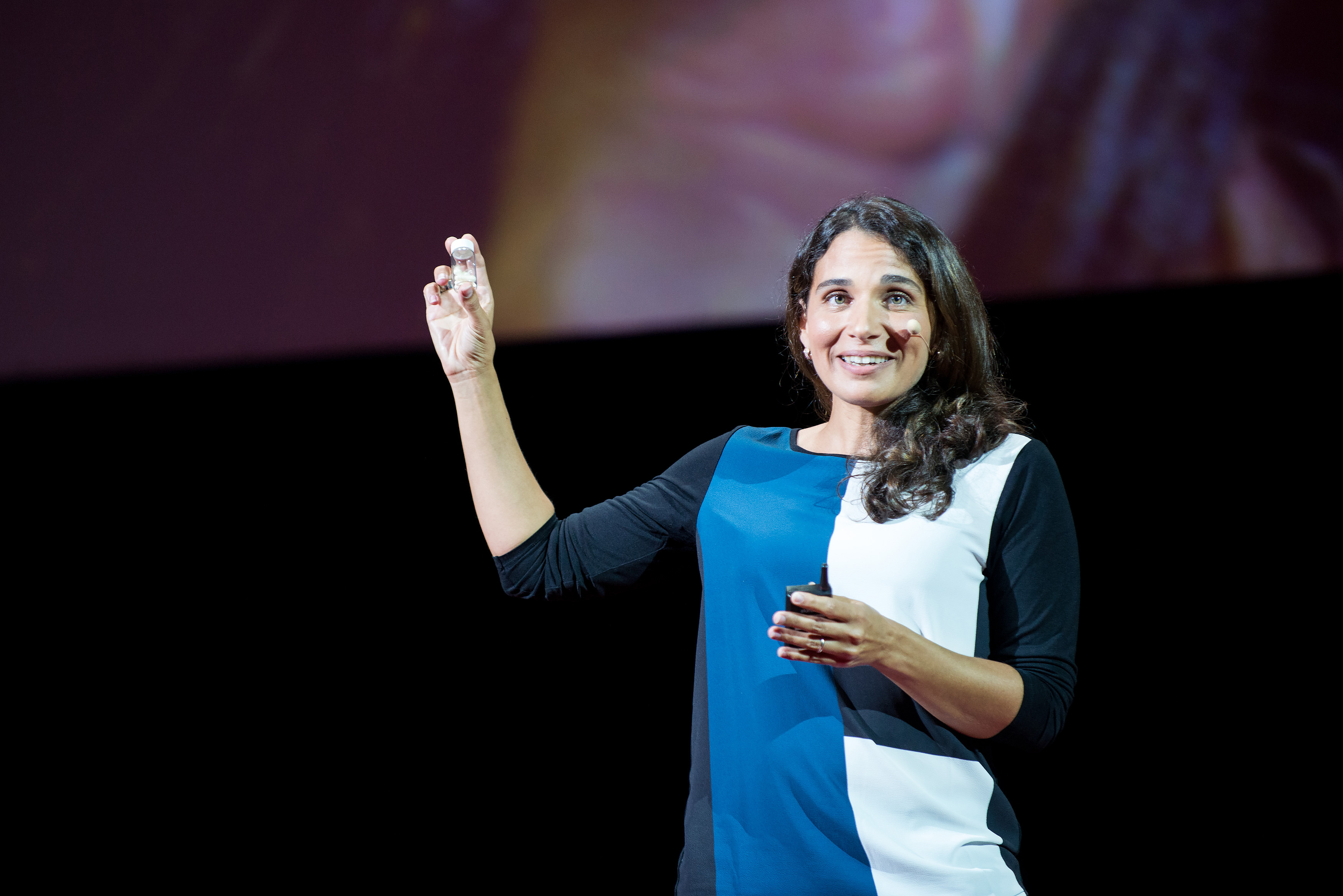
- Education: École Normale Supérieure (B.Sc.) (2002); University of California, Berkeley (Ph.D) (2006)
- Scientific career
- Fields: Coordination Chemistry, Environmental Chemistry
- Workplaces: University of California, Berkeley
- Doctoral advisor: Ken Raymond
- Website: abergel.lbl.gov

Rebecca Abergel is a professor of nuclear engineering and of chemistry at University of California, Berkeley. Abergel is also a senior faculty scientist in the chemical sciences division of Lawrence Berkeley National Laboratory, where she directs the Glenn T. Seaborg Center and leads the Heavy Element Chemistry research group. She is the recipient of several awards for her research in nuclear and inorganic chemistry.

Her research interests include ligand design and use of spectroscopic characterization methods to study the biological coordination chemistry and toxicity mechanisms of f-elements and inorganic isotopes, especially as applied to decontamination strategies, waste management, remediation, separation, and radiopharmaceutical development.

Abergel is known for leading the development of new drug products for the treatment of populations contaminated with heavy metals and radionuclides. Clinical development and commercialization of these products are now spearheaded by HOPO Therapeutics, which she co-founded.

== Early life and education ==
Abergel was born in Caracas, Venezuela and grew up in Paris, France. She attended the École Normale Supérieure of Paris for her undergraduate degree, where she studied chemistry. While an undergraduate, she received a scholarship to work in the laboratory of Prof. John Arnold at the University of California, Berkeley. She remained at UC Berkeley to conduct her graduate studies, under the supervision of Prof. Ken Raymond. Her doctoral work focused on the synthesis and characterization of siderophore analogs to probe microbial iron transport systems and to develop new iron chelating agents. After earning her PhD in inorganic chemistry, Abergel pursued postdoctoral research in the UC Berkeley Department of Chemistry and the group of Prof. Roland Strong at the Fred Hutchinson Cancer Research Center. There she investigated the bacteriostatic function of the innate immune protein siderocalin in binding siderophores from pathogenic microorganisms such as Bacillus anthracis, for the development of new antibiotics.

== Independent career ==
Abergel began her independent career at Berkeley Lab in 2009. She joined the Nuclear Engineering Department of UC Berkeley in 2018 and became the Heavy Element Chemistry Group Leader and Glenn T. Seaborg Center Director at Berkeley Lab that same year. In 2023, she joined the UC Berkeley Chemistry Department and became Associate Dean of the College of Engineering.

== Honors ==
- Radiation Research Society Vice-President Elect (2023)
- Berkeley Lab Director's Award for Exceptional Achievement in Tech Transfer (2022)
- UC Berkeley Kenneth N. Raymond Lectureship in Inorganic Chemistry (2022)
- Bakar Faculty Fellow (2021)
- DOE Secretary of Energy Achievement Honor Award - COVID-19 Clinical Testing Teams (2020)
- DOE Secretary of Energy Achievement Honor Award - National Virtual Biotechnology Laboratory (2020)
- Hellman Faculty Fellow (2020)
- AAAS Fellow (2019)
- KAIST Nuclear & Quantum Engineering Pioneer Lecturer (2019)
- American Chemical Society WCC Rising Star award (2017)
- DOE Early Career Award (2014)
- MIT Technology Review Innovators Under 35 – France (2014)
- Berkeley Lab Director's Award for Exceptional Scientific Achievement (2013)
- Berkeley Lab Women at the Lab Award (2013)
- Radiation Research Society Junior Faculty NCRP Award (2013)
- Cooley's Anemia Foundation Young Investigator Award (2009)
