= Gerhard Krohn Rollefson =

American chemist

- Born: 12 January 1900; Grand Forks
- Education: University of California, Berkeley, University of Wisconsin–Madison
- Occupation: Chemist
- Employers: University of California, Berkeley; University of Wisconsin System
- Awards: Guggenheim Fellowship (chemistry, 1925)

Gerhard Krohn Rollefson (1900–1955) was a professor of Chemistry at the University of California, Berkeley and a recipient of a Guggenheim Fellowship.

== Background and career ==
Rollefson received his bachelor's and master's degrees from the University of Wisconsin–Madison. His dissertation concerned Ebullioscopic constant measurement of mixed liquid media. He then completed his Ph.D. at the University of California, Berkeley. Rollefson was a specialist in physical chemistry and studied the impact of X-ray radiation on a variety of materials. Rollefson published a book with Milton Burton in 1939: Photochemistry and the Mechanisms of Chemical Reactions.

Rollefson was a long-serving editor of Annual Reviews in Physical Chemistry.

== Sources ==
- University of California bio of Rollefson
- Guggenheim Fellowship page for Rollefson
