= Polish Radiation Research Society =

Polish Radiation Research Society memorial to Maria Skłodowska-Curie
- Formation: 1967
- Type: Scientific society
- Legal status: Public benefit organization
- Headquarters: Warsaw
- Location: Poland
- President: Marek Zmyślony
- Website: http://www.ptbr.org.pl/index.php/en/

The Polish Radiation Research Society (PRRS) (Polish: Polskie Towarzystwo Badań Radiacyjnych), memorial to Maria Skłodowska-Curie, is a scientific association of professional researchers and amateurs interested in the studies of radiation interactions with matter.

The mission of the Society is to support and popularize the development of scientific research related to the ionizing radiation and non-ionizing electromagnetic radiation. The PRRS members are physicists, chemists, biologists, medical doctors, engineers and technicians representing various research communities. The PRRS belongs to the International Association for Radiation Research (IARR) and collaborates with the European Radiation Research Society (ERRS).

== History ==
The Society was established in 1967 to promote contact between various Polish institutes, laboratories, and research groups involved in the radiation studies. The formal founding meeting on June 29, 1967, was attended by 31 scientists who appointed the Organizing Committee consisting of: Stefan Minc (Chairman), Janusz Beer (Secretary), Roman Broszkiewicz, Andrzej Danysz, Bogusława Jeżowska-Trzebiatowska, Maria Kopeć, Jerzy Kroh, and Tadeusz Obara. The first National Meeting of PRRS took place on January 8, 1969, in Warsaw and elected Jerzy Kroh as the Society President.

The PRRS has currently around 300 members and is organized in 6 regional branches at: Gliwice, Kielce, Kraków, Łódź, Siedlce, and Warsaw.

== Activities ==
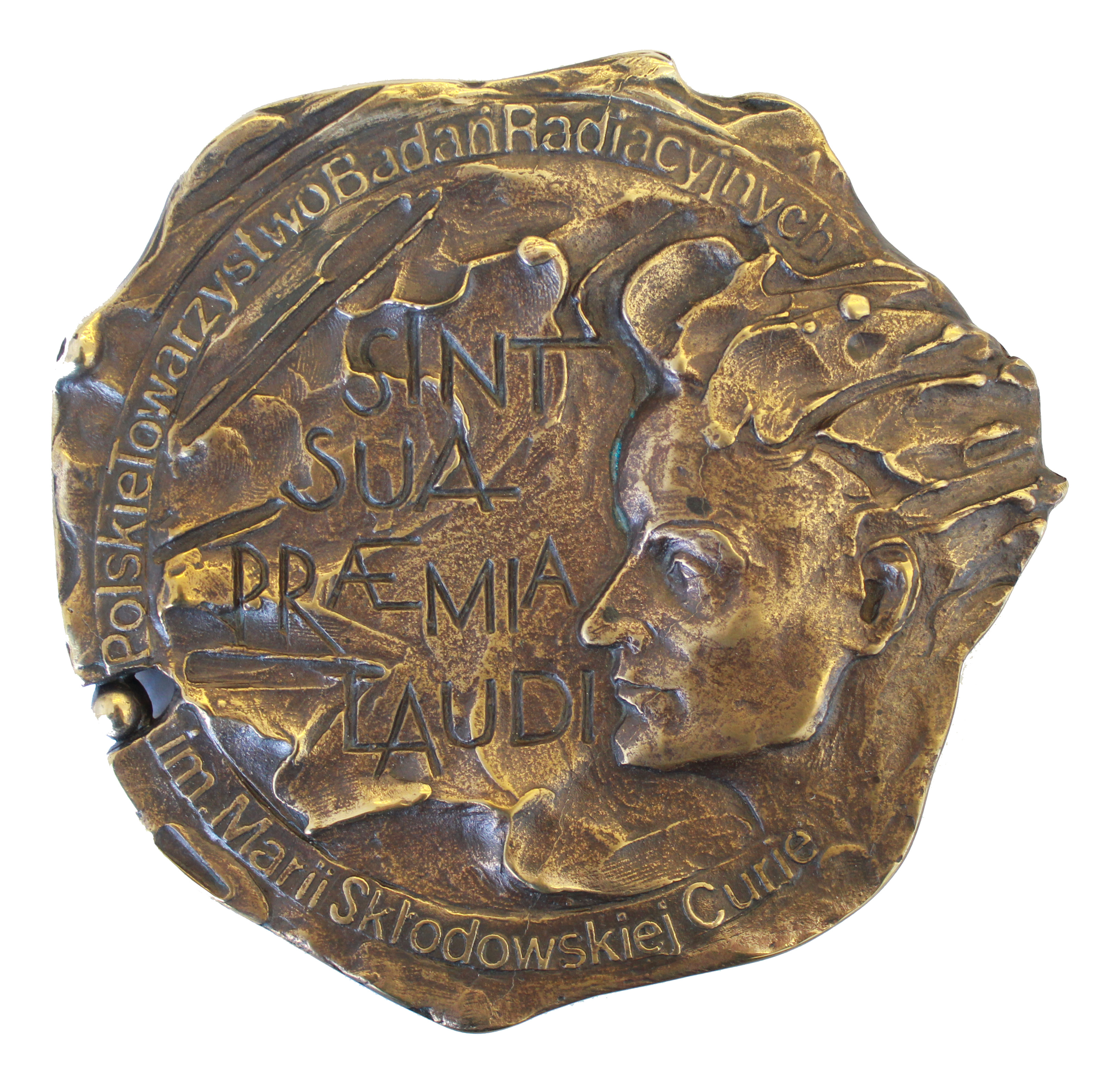
The Maria Skłodowska-Curie Medal awarded by the PRRS to outstanding scientists in the field of radiation research

The PRRS organizes conferences, scientific meetings, lectures, training courses, and contests covering the field of radiation research and related areas. It also awards prizes for outstanding scientific achievements and funds grants to promising young researchers. The Society publishes books and other scientific materials, expresses opinions on radiation-related issues, and petitions the state authorities in this regard.

Every three years, the PRRS organizes its National Scientific Meetings which serve as a forum for presenting the research achievements by the Society members and supporters. At these meetings, the PRRS scientific awards and the Maria Skłodowska-Curie Medals are presented to the laureates.

The PRRS is also active on the international stage and has been entrusted the organization of important scientific events. The Society organized two Annual Meetings (in 1981 and 2000) of the European Society for Radiation Biology and the XIV International Congress of Radiation Research (ICRR’2011) – the world's largest conference in this field and the official meeting of IARR delegates.

It has been a long tradition (since 1970) for the Society to organize its ‘Autumn Schools’ which are educational meetings directed not only towards the research community, but also industry and the state institutions responsible for radiation safety, emergency situations, or environment protection. The Schools’ programmes cover the important topics in fundamental and applied radiation research, radiation technology, and radiation protection, as well as legal issues concerning the ionizing and non-ionizing radiation. The Autumn School lectures are usually published as monographs.

Since 2005 the PRRS has had the status of a public benefit organization.

== Awards and medals ==
The PRRS Scientific Awards for outstanding publications in the field of radiation research were established in 1970. The awards have the form of a cast bronze statuette (designed by Hanna Jelonek) and honorary diploma. They are currently awarded in five sub-disciplines: radiation chemistry and photochemistry, radiobiology, radiotherapy, radiation protection, bioelectromagnetism and non-ionizing radiation.

Since 1980 the Society has also awarded the Maria Skłodowska-Curie Medals – its highest and internationally renowned scientific prizes. The Medals are awarded to Polish and foreign scholars for their outstanding achievements in the field of radiation studies and contribution to the development of this research in Poland. The cast bronze medal was designed by Hanna Jelonek based on an earlier design by Józef Markiewicz.
