= Atomic Bomb Casualty Commission =

Commission investigating the effects of atomic bomb radiation from 1946 to 1975

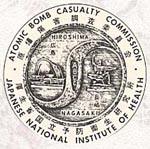

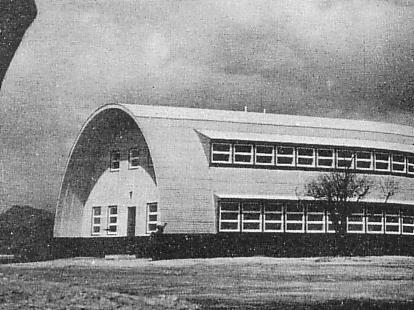
- ABCC Building at a hilltop of Hijiyama, Hiroshima (circa 1954)
- Abbreviation: ABCC
- Successor: Radiation Effects Research Foundation
- Formation: November 26, 1946; 79 years ago
- Founder: Lewis Weed
- Dissolved: April 1, 1975; 51 years ago

The Atomic Bomb Casualty Commission (ABCC) (Japanese:原爆傷害調査委員会, Genbakushōgaichōsaiinkai) was a commission established in 1946 in accordance with a presidential directive from Harry S. Truman to the National Academy of Sciences-National Research Council to conduct investigations of the late effects of radiation among the atomic-bomb survivors in Hiroshima and Nagasaki. As it was erected purely for scientific research and study, not as a provider of medical care and also because it was heavily supported by the United States, the ABCC was generally mistrusted by most survivors and Japanese alike. It operated for nearly thirty years before its dissolution in 1975.

== History ==
The Atomic Bomb Casualty Commission (ABCC) was formed after the United States attack on Hiroshima and Nagasaki on August 6 and August 9, 1945. The ABCC originally began as the Joint Commission The ABCC set out to obtain first-hand technical information and make a report to let people know the opportunities for a long-term study of atomic bomb casualties. In 1946, Lewis Weed, head of the National Research Council, called together a group of scientists who agreed that a "detailed and long-range study of the biological and medical effects upon the human being" was "of the utmost importance to the United States and mankind in general." President Harry S. Truman ordered the ABCC into existence on November 26, 1946. The key members in the ABCC were Lewis Weed, National Research Council physicians Austin M. Brues and Paul Henshaw, and Army representatives Melvin A. Block, and James V. Neel who was also an MD with a Ph.D. in genetics. The fifth person on the team was USNV Ltd. Jg Fredrick Ullrich of Naval Medical Research Center appointed by the National Research Council at the suggestion of the Surgeon General's Office.

== The Atomic Bomb Casualty Commission's Work ==
The ABCC arrived in Japan on November 24, 1946, and familiarized themselves with the procedures of the Japanese military. They visited Hiroshima and Nagasaki to see what work was being done. They found that the Japanese had a well-organized medical group under the Japanese National Research Council, who were carrying out studies on both immediate and delayed atomic bomb damage in survivors. It's almost impossible to get an exact figure of how many people were killed in the two bombings, because both cities had people who had evacuated since it was a time of war. Hiroshima expected bombings, since they were an important military supply center, so many people had left the area. There were also people from surrounding areas who would come into the city on an irregular basis to serve in work crews. Robert Holmes, who was director of the ABCC from 1954 to 1957, said that "[the survivors] are the most important people living"

The ABCC also drew on the work of Chinese scientists, who were already studying the survivors in the time before the ABCC arrived in Japan, so there was information from both American and Chinese officials. Masao Tsuzuki was the leading Japanese authority on the biological effects of radiation. He said there were four causes of injury in the bombed cities: heat, blast, primary radiation and radioactive poisonous gas. In a report that was released by Tsuzuki, he answered the question, "What does strong radioactive energy do to the human body?" His answer was, "damage to blood, then hematopoietic organs such as bone marrow, spleen, and lymph nodes. All are destroyed or damaged severely. Lungs, intestines, liver, kidney etc are affected and their functions disturbed as a result." The damages were rated by severity. People suffering from severe damage were people who were in within a 1 km radius of the hypocenter. The severely affected people typically died within a few days, some living as long as two weeks. Moderate damage was seen in people living in a 1–2 km. radius from the hypocenter, and those people would live for 2–6 weeks. Those people living within a 2–4 km. radius had slight damage, and which would not cause death, but would cause some health problems during the several months after the exposure.

== The ABCC grows ==
The ABCC grew rapidly in 1948 and 1949. Their staff numbers quadrupled in just one year. By 1951 the total stood at 1063 employees – 143 allied and 920 Japanese personnel. Perhaps the most important research undertaken by the ABCC was the genetics study, which focused its study on the uncertainties surrounding the possible long-term effects of ionizing radiation in pregnant women and their unborn children. The study did not find evidence of widespread genetic damage. It did, however, find increased incidence of microcephaly and intellectual disabilities in children most proximally exposed in utero to the bombs' radiation. The genetics project studied the effects of radiation on the survivors and their children. This project turned out to be the largest and most interactive of the ABCC programs. In 1957, Japan passed the Atomic Bomb Survivors Relief Law, which qualified certain people for two medical exams per year. The Japanese term for the survivors of the atomic bombs is hibakusha. The qualifications for medical care were those within a few kilometers of the hypocenters at the time of the bombings; those within 2 kilometers of the hypocenters within two weeks of the bombings; those exposed to radiation from fallout and children who were in utero by women who fit into any of the other categories.

=== Pros and cons of the ABCC ===
There were pros and cons to the ABCC. The cons: they overlooked Japanese needs in small details. The flooring in the waiting room for mothers and babies was polished linoleum, and women in their wooden clogs would often slip and fall. The signs and magazines in the waiting rooms were in English. The ABCC did not actually treat the survivors they studied, they just studied them over periods of time. They had them come for examination during weekday working hours, causing the person to lose a day of pay, and they offered little compensation to the survivors. ABCC was there that they performed medical exams on hibakusha and autopsies on the dead, as well as collected countless numbers of blood and urine samples. However, they did not perform any kind of medical treatment, despite the fact that treatment was what the hibakusha wanted. This led to criticism that they were treated as guinea pigs even though the war was over.

The pros: they provided people with valuable medical information. Infants received a check up at birth and again at 9 months, which was not common at the time. Medical check ups on healthy infants were unheard of. Adults also benefited from frequent medical examinations.

== ABCC becomes the RERF ==
In 1951, the Atomic Energy Commission (AEC) was planning on stopping funding for the ABCC's work in Japan. However, James V. Neel made an appeal and the AEC decided to fund them $20,000 a year, for three years, to continue research. In 1956, Neel and William J. Schull published their final draft of The Effect of Exposure to the Atomic Bombs on Pregnancy Termination in Hiroshima and Nagasaki. This monograph gave a detailed description of all the data they had collected Despite their efforts, trust in the ABCC was declining, so the ABCC became the Radiation Effects Research Foundation (RERF), and with the new name and administrative organization, funding for the research on survivors was to be provided equally by the United States and Japan. The RERF was established on 1 April 1975. A binational organization run by both the United States and Japan, the RERF is still in operation today.

== Criticisms and Discussions about ABCC ==
The Atomic Bomb Casualty Commission (ABCC, 1946–1975) collected information on the medical effects of the nuclear bomb on hibakusha without providing any medical care, relief, or financial compensation for studies that could last an entire day for an already impoverished population. Although it was not part of the occupation authorities, it served as an information-gathering tool for the United States. While Japanese and American doctors worked on the project, the United States ultimately took possession of all research data, studies, photographs, and specimens (including body parts, sometimes taken without family consent) collected, much of which remains in the United States today. Information gathered by doctors was not allowed to be published or shared in Japan during the occupation. This included medical reports and autopsies of hibakusha. Most reports on the humanitarian consequences of the bomb were suppressed in both the United States and Japan. Propaganda was also used to contradict medical findings, particularly regarding radiation effects, in the American press. While Japanese doctors treated and collected patient data, creating records, these reports were later taken by the United States, prohibited from publication, and remain difficult to access at the National Archives in Maryland. Certain human specimens and clinical studies were retained in the United States until May 1973, causing distress to the families of hibakusha.

American study of the effects of thermal burns on hibakusha, including keloids and physical disabilities.

Many hibakusha testified to the humiliation of being required to remain naked for hours while being photographed, filmed, and examined like test subjects by the ABCC. They had to endure the embarrassment of exposing severe baldness, giving blood samples, and undergoing tissue extractions without any support. Victims reported harassment from the ABCC, which frequently summoned them for examinations or even retrieved children from schools without parental consent (or despite parental protests). The hours spent under examination posed an additional burden for hibakusha, making it difficult for them to secure jobs, with no financial compensation or even refreshments provided, despite their extreme poverty. The ABCC also conducted numerous autopsies, up to 500 annually, extracting tissues and body parts, often without family consent, to send to the United States. These autopsies were frequently performed immediately after death, adding to the distress of the families. Survivors endured relentless harassment without any form of compensation, and the deceased, including children, were subjected to dissections.

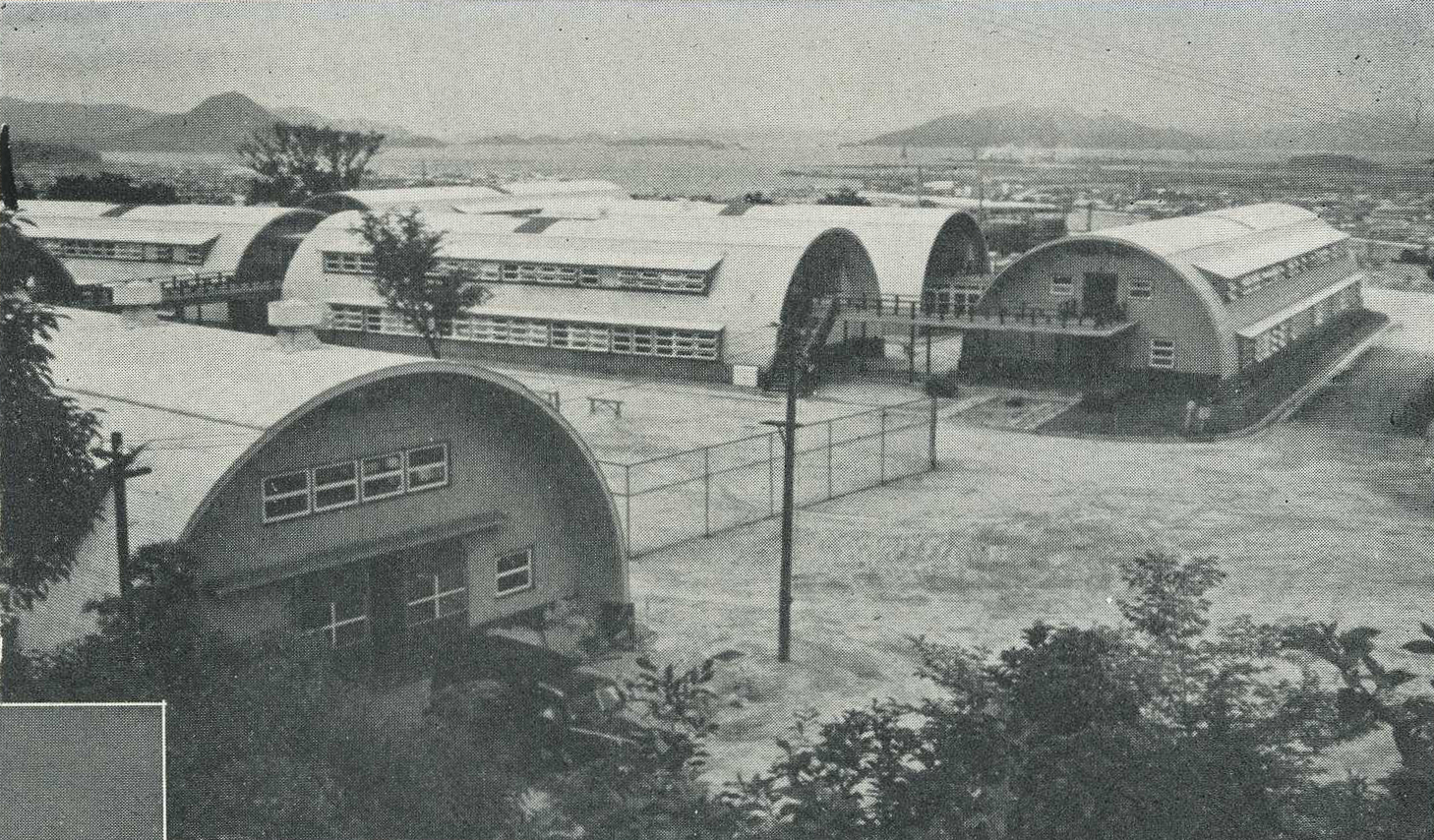
ABCC facility, 1955.

Most surviving pregnant women during the bombing experienced miscarriages, while surviving babies suffered from microcephaly, heart diseases, severe intellectual disabilities, and developmental delays due to high radiation exposure in utero. Women were informed that stress and malnutrition were the causes, leading them to blame themselves. Due to censorship, they only learned later of the true causes of these abnormalities.

Without available data, no conclusions could be drawn, preventing any publication on the hibakusha. Due to the censorship of reports, no Japanese individual could learn about the consequences of radiation exposure, leading to the deaths of those who remained exposed to radioactivity. For deceased hibakusha, the removal of their organs without consent violated the wishes of their families. For survivors, their medical records—critical for long-term survivors to prove their hibakusha status and obtain adequate medical aid—often went missing. By the time medical reports became accessible, it was too late for many hibakusha.

When hibakusha were finally granted medical assistance from the Japanese government, they were required to provide documentation to prove their status. Since more than 23,000 pieces of data, including clinical reports, human remains, and other materials, were kept classified as state secrets in the United States until May 1973, many hibakusha struggled to substantiate their status.

Similar to the Tuskegee Syphilis Study, it is sometimes cited as an example of medical intervention carried out primarily for experimental purposes rather than patient care.

Similarities and differences between the ABCC and the Tuskegee Syphilis Study
	Country	Time Period	Subjects	Goal	Medical Treatment Provided?	Informed Consent?	Ethical Violations	Context	Racial Component
ABCC	United States (operating in Japan)	1947–1975	Japanese atomic bomb survivors	Study long-term health effects of radiation	No treatment offered—only examinations and data collection	No informed consent; subjects often unaware of research scope	Non-consensual organ/tissue collection, refusal of care	Peacetime research on foreign civilians	Japanese survivors treated as research subjects, not patients
Tuskegee Syphilis Study	United States	1932–1972	African American men with syphilis	Observe natural progression of untreated syphilis	No treatment provided—even after penicillin became available	No informed consent; subjects were misled about receiving treatment	Deception, withholding of life-saving treatment	Peacetime research on U.S. citizens	Based on systemic racism targeting Black Americans

=== Nishiyama district in Nagasaki ===
The ABCC commission also focused on the Nishiyama district in Nagasaki. Mountains lay between the hypocenter and Nishiyama, which prevented the radiation and heat from the explosion from directly reaching Nishiyama, resulting in no immediate damage. However, due to falling ash and rain, significant radiation was still present. Therefore, after the war, health surveys were conducted without informing the local population of their true purpose. Initially, these studies in Nishiyama were carried out by the U.S. military, but they were later handed over to the ABCC commission.

A few months after the atomic bombings, residents of Nishiyama showed a significant increase in white blood cell counts. In animals, leukemia can develop after full-body exposure to radiation, so researchers wanted to examine what happens in humans. Osteosarcoma was also diagnosed in individuals following oral ingestion of radioactive material. According to the report written by the ABCC commission, the residents of the Nishiyama district, who were not directly hit by the atomic bombing, were considered an ideal population to observe the effects of residual radiation.

The United States continued the research on residual radiation even after Japan regained independence, but the results were never shared with the residents of Nishiyama. As a result, residents continued farming after the war, but the number of leukemia patients increased, and more people died.

After the atomic bombings, Japanese scientists wanted to conduct research to help heal the hibakusha, but the SCAP did not permit Japanese researchers to study the damage caused by the atomic bomb. Especially until 1946, the regulations were strict, which contributed to an increase in deaths from radiation exposure.

=== Use of Thorotrast and ABCC Research in Hiroshima ===
Following World War II, the Atomic Bomb Casualty Commission (ABCC), established by the United States in Hiroshima, conducted medical research using the radioactive contrast agent Thorotrast and a similar agent called Umbra-Tor. Between 1949 and 1951, these agents were administered to male patients aged 19 to 71 at a hospital in Kure, Hiroshima Prefecture, and X-ray imaging was subsequently performed at ABCC facilities.

Thorotrast was widely used internationally from the 1930s to the 1940s. Due to its tendency to remain in the body for an extended period and emit radiation, it was associated with a risk of internal radiation exposure and cancer. In Japan, it is estimated that between 20,000 and 30,000 people received injections of Thorotrast before the end of the war.

A 1964 ABCC report noted that, among 56 individuals who received the contrast agent, nine had died by 1961, raising suspicions of long-term radiation effects, although no direct link to cause of death was stated. Among the 23 surviving patients, 20 still had residues of the agent in their bodies, and 14 exhibited symptoms such as fibrosis. This marked a shift from earlier, more favorable evaluations of Thorotrast toward a more cautious stance.

While Thorotrast was not approved for use in the United States due to safety concerns, research on its effects continued in occupied Hiroshima. It has been suggested that the research data were later removed from Japan and taken abroad.

=== Criticism of Non-Therapeutic Human Research ===
the United States conducted research on the effects of radiation in Japan. Hibakusha were randomly summoned to facilities that appeared to be hospitals, but instead of receiving medical treatment, tens of thousands of survivors were used as research subjects by the Atomic Bomb Casualty Commission (ABCC). When medical professionals identified potentially life-threatening conditions among the survivors, the ABCC did not disclose this information or provide treatment, choosing to observe the progression of the illnesses.

Australian historian Paul Ham has criticized the ABCC's treatment of atomic bomb survivors as akin to using them as laboratory rats.

The directive did not mention treatment: prolonging life, easing pain, were neither the intentions nor the by-products of the job. Whether the patients – or more accurately the exhibits – lived or died was immaterial to the foreign doctors’ charter. How the victims lived or died, whether their conditions improved or deteriorated; whether they suffered from cancer at some distant date or reproduced it in their children; such were the questions of cold scientific enquiry. In short, irradiated Japanese civilians were to serve as American laboratory rats. Herein lay a benefit – future rationalists would argue – of dropping the bomb on a city: to harvest scientific data about gamma radiation.
