= H. Rodney Withers =

Australian radiation biologist and physician

- Born: Hubert Rodney Withers; September 21, 1932; Queensland, Australia
- Died: February 25, 2015 (aged 82)
- Education: The University of Queensland; University of London
- Scientific career
- Fields: Radiobiology
- Workplaces: University of California, Los Angeles

Hubert Rodney Withers (September 21, 1932 – February 25, 2015) was an Australian radiation biologist and physician. He made many contributions to the fields of radiobiology and clinical radiation therapy, but he is best known for his work on post-radiation tissue repair and the effects of ionizing radiation on normal tissues.

Withers was born in Queensland, Australia. He received his medical degree from the University of Queensland and his PhD and DSc from the University of London. He worked at the Gray Laboratory in England, the National Cancer Institute, the M.D. Anderson Cancer Center, the Prince of Wales Hospital, Sydney, and at UCLA where he served as Professor and Chair of the Department of Radiation Oncology.

== Awards and honors ==
Withers received numerous awards and honors for his research including:

- Enrico Fermi Award
- Kettering Prize
- Officer of the Order of Australia
- Gray Medal
