= Herman D. Suit =

American radiation oncologist (1929-2022)

Herman Day Suit (February 8, 1929 — July 2, 2022) was an American physician and radiation oncologist. Suit is a pioneer in precision radiotherapy and proton therapy for cancer.

== Education and career ==
Suit was born in Waco, Texas and studied biology at the University of Houston, obtaining a bachelor's degree in 1948. He studied medicine at Baylor University, obtaining an M.D. in 1952. He completed his specialist training in radiology residency at Jefferson Davis Hospital in Houston. In 1954, he went to the University of Oxford, where he was House Surgeon for Radiotherapy at Churchill Hospital and Research Assistant in the Radiobiology Laboratory. There he received his D.Phil. in radiation biology under Frank Ellis in 1956. From 1957 to 1959, Suit was senior assistant surgeon at the National Cancer Institute in Bethesda, Maryland and from 1959 at the M. D. Anderson Hospital and Tumor Center of the University of Texas Health Science Center at Houston, working under Gilbert Fletcher. Initially, he was an assistant radiotherapist there. He became the head of the experimental radiotherapy department in 1962 and an associate radiotherapist in 1963. Since 1968, Suit was professor of radiotherapy and radiotherapist. From 1969 to 1971 he also conducted research at NASA's Johnson Space Center. In 1970, Suit became Professor of Radiation Therapy at Harvard Medical School and in 1971 Head of the Department of Radiation Medicine at Massachusetts General Hospital. Most recently he was Andres Soriano Professor of Radiation Oncology.

Suit was involved in the introduction of accelerated fractionation in radiotherapy against cancer. In the 1970s, he also worked on proton accelerators for radiation therapy at Harvard Medical School.

== Honor and awards ==
Suit was a member of the American Association for the Advancement of Science. He was president of the between 1987 and 1988. In 1997, he received the Kettering Prize from the General Motors Cancer Research Foundation. In 2011, Suit was awarded an honorary doctorate from the University of Houston.
