= Susan S. Wallace =

American biophysicist and molecular biologist

- Education: Marymount College, Tarrytown (B.S.); University of California, Berkeley (M.S.); Cornell University Graduate School of Medical Sciences (Ph.D.)
- Known for: DNA damage and repair Molecular radiobiology Genome stability
- Awards: Fellow, Radiation Research Society; Fellow of the American Academy of Arts and Sciences; Fellow of the American Association for the Advancement of Science; NIH MERIT Award
- Scientific career
- Fields: Biophysics, Molecular Biology
- Workplaces: University of Vermont; New York Medical College; City University of New York

Susan S. Wallace is an American biophysicist and molecular biologist known for her research in DNA damage and repair, molecular radiobiology, and genome stability. She is a Distinguished Professor Emerita in the Department of Microbiology and Molecular Genetics at the University of Vermont, where she served as department chair for three decades.

== Education ==
Wallace earned a B.S. in Chemistry and Mathematics from Marymount College, Tarrytown, in 1959. She began graduate studies in biophysics at the University of California, Berkeley, receiving an M.S. in Bioradiology in 1961. She completed her Ph.D. in Biophysics at the Cornell University Graduate School of Medical Sciences, Sloan Kettering Division, in 1965. From 1965 to 1967, she was a postdoctoral fellow in immunochemistry at the Columbia University College of Physicians and Surgeons.

== Academic career ==
Wallace began her academic career with faculty appointments at the City University of New York and later at New York Medical College, where she held various roles including Professor in the Department of Microbiology.

In 1988, Wallace joined the University of Vermont as Professor and Chair of the Department of Microbiology and Molecular Genetics. She held this position until 2018, when she was named Distinguished Professor Emerita. She also served as Associate Director for Basic/Translational Research at the University of Vermont Cancer Center and directed programs in genome stability and graduate education. From 2000 to 2007, she led the Department of Energy Vermont EPSCoR Program.

== Selected awards and honors ==
- Fellow, Radiation Research Society (2022–present)
- Fellow of the American Academy of Arts and Sciences (2020–present)
- Fellow of the American Association for the Advancement of Science (2017–present)
- Hubert W. Vogelmann Award for Excellence in Research, University of Vermont (2013)
- John B. Little Award for Molecular Radiobiology, Harvard School of Public Health (2005)
- Elected member, Vermont Academy of Science & Engineering
- Failla Memorial Lecture Award, Radiation Research Society (1996)
- National Institutes of Health MERIT Award (1986–1994, 1995–2003)
