= Radiation Effects Research Foundation =

US-Japan cooperative research institute

- Abbreviation: RERF
- Predecessor: Atomic Bomb Casualty Commission
- Formation: 1 April 1975; 51 years ago
- Founded at: Hiroshima, Japan
- Leader: Dr. Ohtsura Niwa
- Website: https://www.rerf.or.jp/

The Radiation Effects Research Foundation (RERF) is a joint U.S.-Japan research organization responsible for studying the medical effects of radiation and associated diseases in humans for the welfare of the survivors and all humankind. The organization's scientific laboratories are located in Hiroshima and Nagasaki, Japan.

RERF's studies into radiation health effects have continued for more than 70 years, making RERF unique for its conduct of epidemiological and other research on such a large population (more than 120,000 individuals) over such a long timeframe. RERF continues its research with the aim of further elucidating the effects of A-bomb radiation on human health.

RERF carries out research in numerous scientific fields, including epidemiology, clinical medicine, genetics, and immunology. Findings from RERF's studies are utilized not only for the medical care and welfare of the A-bomb survivors but also for the establishment of international radiation protection standards.

== History ==
RERF is the successor organization to the Atomic Bomb Casualty Commission (ABCC), established in 1947 by the U.S. government. ABCC's mission was to determine the long-term effects on health from exposure to radiation in A-bomb survivors and their children.

In the 1950s, an extensive interview survey was conducted, based on which records were compiled for each of the A-bomb survivor participants in the ABCC studies. These records detailed location of each survivor at the time of the bombing and structure of the building, or "shielding" as it is known, that the survivor may have been in at the time. Based on such records, radiation doses from the atomic bombings were estimated for the A-bomb survivors. Accurate estimates of radiation exposure were crucial for tying a specific dose to a certain health effect observed in later studies of health effects in the survivors.

ABCC was reorganized into RERF, a research institute jointly funded by the governments of Japan and the United States, on 1 April 1975, as a nonprofit foundation under jurisdiction of the Japan Ministry of Foreign Affairs and the Ministry of Health and Welfare. On 1 April 2012, RERF transitioned to a public interest incorporated foundation upon authorization by Japan's Prime Minister.

== Research Programs ==
RERF studies the effects of radiation on the survivors of the atomic bombings in Japan.

=== Life Span Study (LSS) ===
The Life Span Study (LSS) is a research program investigating life-long health effects based on epidemiologic (cohort and case-control) studies. Its major objective is to investigate the long-term effects of A-bomb radiation on causes of death and incidence of cancer. About 120,000 subjects selected from residents of Hiroshima and Nagasaki identified through the national census in 1950 have been followed since that time, including 94,000 atomic-bomb survivors and 27,000 unexposed individuals. The study gathers samples from the study population of both sexes and all ages. For that reason, and due to its long duration, it is considered to be among the most informative epidemiological studies in the world. It continues to provide information about cancer incidence, cancer mortality, and non-cancer effects in the survivors. The LSS will be continued for the lifetimes of the participants.

=== Adult Health Study (AHS) ===
The Adult Health Study (AHS) is a clinical research program based on biennial health examinations. Its major objective is to investigate the long-term effects of A-bomb radiation on health. About 20,000 subjects selected from the Life Span Study (LSS) cohort have been followed since 1958, with an additional 2,400 LSS participants and 1,000 in utero-exposed persons added to the study in 1977. The examinations include a general physical exam, ECG, chest X-ray, ultrasonography, and biochemical tests. Using the data collected during these health examinations, it is possible to conduct long-term follow-up studies of the prevalence and incidence of diseases and changes in physiological and biochemical endpoints. Long-term observation of the changes in measurement values, such as blood pressure, benefits participants and contributes to the health management of the A-bomb survivors.

=== Children of Atomic-bomb Survivors (F1) Study ===
The children of the atomic bomb survivors are studied to determine whether genetic effects might be apparent that could be related to parental A-bomb radiation exposure. An initial study of birth defects did not reveal any discernable effects. Subsequent studies on mortality and cancer incidence, chromosome abnormalities, and serum proteins were also conducted, but again no radiation effect has been observed. Presently, continued mortality and cancer-incidence follow-up and molecular studies on DNA are being conducted. Starting from 2002, a new clinical study was initiated to investigate lifestyle-related diseases that are not observable at birth but start to appear after middle age (e.g., hypertension, diabetes mellitus, etc.). This study was conducted to examine over a period of four years about 12,000 people.

=== In Utero Study ===
The in utero study is a unique evaluation of the lifetime health experience of a specially exposed population, namely those in utero at the time of the bombings (about 3,600 persons). It is not known whether the sensitivity to radiation effects of this group is similar to or greater than that of the youngest postnatal group (0–5 years). The continued follow-up of this cohort through middle and old age until mortality is projected to be highly informative.

=== Genetics Study ===
The genetics study is largely carried out by the Department of Molecular Biosciences. Individual radiation doses are assessed by evaluation of chromosome aberration frequency in the blood cells of A-bomb survivors. Radiation doses can also be estimated with special techniques that measure trace amounts of radicals that remain in the teeth of A-bomb survivors. By evaluating DNA from parents and children, studies are carried out to determine whether de novo mutation rates are increased among the children of A-bomb survivors. Efforts are also being made to accurately detect radiation-induced mutation rates using mouse models. Studies have been initiated to examine genomic instability (marked by high-frequency genome-wide changes) and genetic effects on cancer (association between radiation exposure and individual genetic characteristics).

=== Immunology ===
Evidence is emerging that atomic-bomb radiation led to certain changes in the immune system of exposed persons. State-of-the-art methods used to characterize cells of the immune system are being applied to better understand these changes and to assess their possible impact on health.

=== Cytogenetics ===
The cytogenetics evaluations provide one means of assessing radiation exposure (through what is termed "biological dosimetry") by evaluating the types and amounts of structural damage in chromosomes due to radiation.

=== A-bomb Dosimetry ===
Assessing the risks of radiation exposure requires knowledge of the dose of radiation received. There are no direct measurements of dose for individual survivors. This program is concerned with providing survivor dose estimates. Basic information on radiation exposures are based on modern understanding of the physics of the bombs and the results of extremely sensitive measurements that can detect minute traces of the A-bomb radiation exposure in various types of materials (concrete, granite, copper, etc.). To estimate the dose received by an individual survivor, this information is combined with historical interview data pertaining to that survivor's location and shielding at the time of the bombings. The dosimetry program is also concerned with developing a better understanding of the uncertainties in survivor dose estimates and how to account for the effect of these uncertainties on risk estimates.

== Facilities ==
RERF operates two scientific research and clinical facilities: one in Hiroshima and one in Nagasaki.
