= Laurent Degos =

French physician

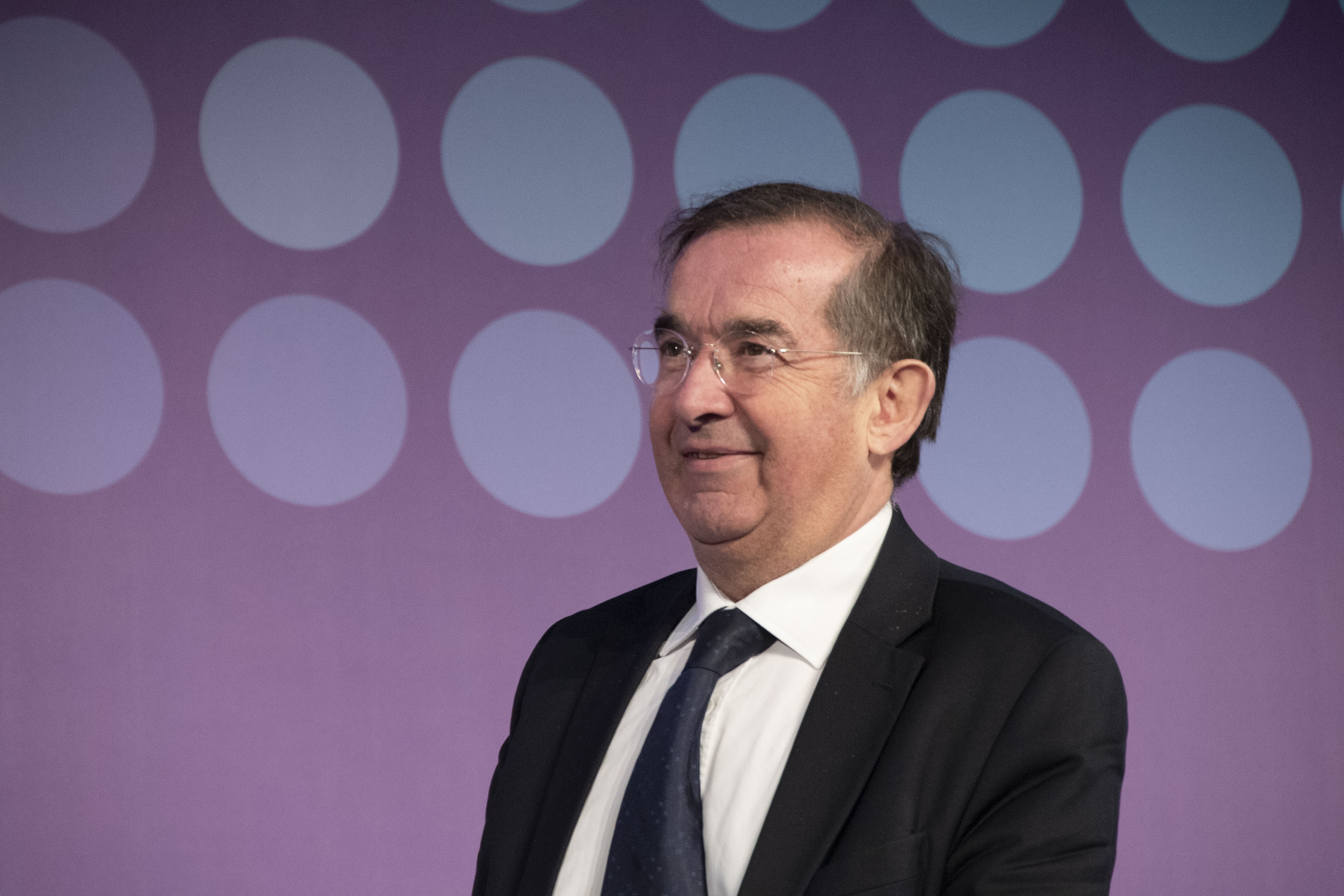
Laurent Degos

Laurent Degos, Professor of Haematology at the University of Paris, was born on July 9, 1945, in Paris (75008) from Robert Degos (1904–1987) medical doctor, Professor of Dermatology and Monique Lortat Jacob (1916–1999), third of four children, an older brother Jean Denis (1937–2001) Professor of Neurology, Claude François Professor of Neurology (born 1939) and a younger sister Bernadette Flamant (born 1947). He was married to Françoise Fouchard (hepatologist) on 16 December 1971 with whom he had three children Juliette Barbarin (lawyer at Total), Cecile Petit-Degos (scenographer), and Vincent Degos (Professor of Anesthesia Resuscitation) and nine grandchildren (Arthur, Maylis, Paul Barbarin, Jules, Zelie, Tom Petit and Oscar, Augustin, Felix Degos). The Degos family is from Mugron (Landes) with several generations of country medical doctors: Jean Baptiste (1797–1859), Alfred (1840–1925) and Louis (1873–1928), his grandfather.

He is a corresponding member of the French Academy of sciences.

== Biography ==
Laurent Degos obtained his doctorate of medicine in 1976 and his doctorate of University in 1973 at the Paris Diderot University France. He was a resident of the Paris Hospitals (1967) and obtained his Master's degree in "Management of health research" in 1983 at Harvard T.H. Chan School of Public Health (US).

Laurent Degos, a close collaborator of Jean Dausset (Nobel Prize winner 1980) since 1969, succeeded him in 1980 as head of the immunogenetics laboratory (Inserm). He was elected Councillor for International workshops of Histocompatibility (Los Angeles 1980). He discovered genes and alleles of the histocompatibility complex, made innovations in formal genetics (binding imbalance) and population genetics (selection, genetic distance).

He was Vice-President of the Institut Curie (2011–2014) and Vice-President of the Institut Pasteur (2014–2016).

As a research manager, Laurent Degos has been elected to several evaluation commissions (Inserm, CNRS, National Council of Universities), Director of the University Institute, International Advisor (Histocompatibility), President of international congresses (EHA 1994, ISQUA 2010, Health and Tech Conference 2017). His position in national agencies gave him the opportunity to be called upon in various institutions as an advisor. In addition, he is interested in the new generation, writing science books for children, textbooks for students, co-founder and board member of the MURS, (science and society). Having been Director of the Inserm U 93 Unit (1981–1993), Director of the University Institute of Haematology (1993–2003 Univ. Paris), Director of the Doctoral School of Biology and Biotechnology (1993–2003) he is also involved in current debates on scientific integrity.

Laurent Degos has a broad disciplinary field in medical sciences (molecular biology, cell biology, clinical trials) and studies transverse disciplines (immunology, oncology, hematology, transplantation, public health). He has collectively taken over the concepts and developments as president of public (Delegate for Clinical Research Ile de France) or private (Genset, IEPS) research councils. He currently sits on the boards of directors and committees of SMEs: "2nd opinion" (chairman of the scientific committee), Metafora (strategy) and Care Insight (board of directors), e-Sana (strategy). He has also demonstrated his ability to obtain interdisciplinary and multidisciplinary research for policy within the framework of the Bioalliance of European Medical Societies and has successfully joined European Member States by co-founding Eunet HTA for the study of comparative efficacy of health products and leading Eunet PAS for patient safety research.

Laurent Degos has experience of scientific advice and political responsibilities at the Council of Europe (Histocompatibility 1980), DG Sanco (Eunet HTA 2005–2011 EuNetPAS 2007–2011) and DG RTD (steering committee and leader of the WG1 SPH 2015–). He has demonstrated authority and independence as guest scientific advisor for the preparation of the US Affordable Care Act (ACA) on comparative efficacy research, representing France alongside three other members from the United Kingdom, Germany and Australia, and as guest member of the nomination committee in China for the CAS institute for translational medicine (Canton). He was also a member of the High Level Group on Health at the OECD and President of the Sino-French Foundation for Science and Technology (FFCSA Chinese - Chinese Academy of Science and French Academy of sciences (2011–2017).

== Scientific work ==
Laurent Degos has defined platelet glycoproteins recently used as targets for anticoagulation. His original and anti-dogmatic vision made it possible to discover how to transform a malignant cell into a normal cell (1982) with medical doctors in Shanghai (China) including Wang Zhen Yi and Chen Zhu in the case of the most severe acute leukaemia (acute promyelocytic leukaemia) which is now easily and permanently cured in all "standard" cases with two natural products, a vitamin A derivative and arsenic, without chemotherapy or bone marrow transplantation, opening a new approach to cancer treatment (malignant cell differentiation treatment, personalized medicine, precision treatments, targeted treatments) that has won several international awards, including the General Motors Prize, the most prestigious award for cancer research. He also continued his research in social, economic and human sciences as President of the French High Authority on Health (2005–2011) where he headed a college of 8 executive members, 400 high-level collaborators, 3,000 experts (62,000K€) to evaluate health technology, to make recommendations for good practices, certify healthcare establishments, and provide medical and economic advice, after having been President of the Afssaps (Medicines Agency) (2003–2005) and President of the French Transplant Establishment (2003–2005) (transformed into the French Biomedicine Agency in 2004).

He is the author of several hundred publications.

== Main books ==
He is the author of many books including :

- Quelle politique de Santé pour demain ?
- Éloge de l'erreur
- Santé : Sortir des crises
- Les organes de mon corps
- Mon corps : cent mille milliards de cellules
- Cloner est-il immoral ?

== Honours and awards ==
=== Scientific and research administration bodies ===
- Member of the Inserm's specialized scientific commission "Biology and general molecular pathology, general immunology, genetics, general virology, bacteriology, parasitology" (1979–1982), member of the scientific council (1983–1986).
- Chairman of the Scientific Council of the Institute of Hematology (1990), of the Scientific Council of Genset (1990–2003).
- President of the Scientific Council of the Institute for Health Policy Studies (1994).
- Chairman of the Scientific Council of the Assistance publique - Hôpitaux de Paris (1995, re-elected in 1999).
- Regional Delegate for Clinical Research (1995–2002).
- President of the Afssaps (French Agency for the Health Security of Health Products) and the Biomedicine Agency.
- President of the College of the High Authority for Health - HAS (2005–2010).
- Editor-in-Chief of the Presse Médicale (1979–1983).
- Editor-in-Chief of The Hematology Journal (1999–2002).
- Member of the editorial board and founding member of the journal of medicine and science (1985–1998).
- Associate editor of Leukemia (1989) and Annals of hematology (1990).
- Vice-President of the Universal Movement of Scientific Responsibility (MURS).

=== Scholarly Societies - Academies ===
- Member of the International Society of Hematology.
- Member of the American Society of Hematology.
- Member of the American Associate of Cancer Research.
- Adviser for the International Histocompatibility Workshops (since 1980).
- Member of the High Committee on Transfusion Safety (1992–1995).
- Corresponding member of the French Academy of sciences, Institut de France (1996).
- Honorary Doctorate from Shanghai University, China.
- Member of the International Scientific Committee of the Guangzhou Institute of Biomedicine and Health, Chinese Academy of Sciences.
- Secretary General of the European Hematology Association (1997–2000).

=== Awards - Awards ===
- Prize of the French Academy of sciences - Institut de France (1979 and 1984).
- League Against Cancer Award (1978 and 1993).
- Institute of Health Sciences Award (1988).
- Elected Physician of the Year, with Wang Zhen Yi (1991).
- Sven Killmann Prize - Leukemia, Genoa, Italy (1992).
- General Motors Award with Zhen-Yi Wang, Washington (1994).
- Loubaresse Prize of the Institut Curie with Anne Dejean (1996).
- Charles Brupbacher Foundation Prize with Zhen-Yi Wang, Zurich (1997).
- Jean Bernard Prize from the Fondation pour la recherche médicale (2002).
- Gagna Prize with Anne Dejean, Brussels (2003).
- Mitjaville Prize of the Academy of Medicine (2004).
- Chevalier of the Palmes Académiques, Chevalier of the Légion d'Honneur, Officier of the Ordre National du Mérite
