= Radiation chemistry =

Study of the chemical effects of radiation on matter

Radiation chemistry is a subdivision of nuclear chemistry which studies the chemical effects of ionizing radiation on matter. This is quite different from radiochemistry, as no radioactivity needs to be present in the material which is being chemically changed by the radiation. An example is the conversion of water into hydrogen gas and hydrogen peroxide.

== Radiation interactions with matter ==
As ionizing radiation moves through matter its energy is deposited through interactions with the electrons of the absorber. The result of an interaction between the radiation and the absorbing species is removal of an electron from an atom or molecular bond to form radicals and excited species. The radical species then proceed to react with each other or with other molecules in their vicinity. It is the reactions of the radical species that are responsible for the changes observed following irradiation of a chemical system.

Charged radiation species (α and β particles) interact through Coulombic forces between the charges of the electrons in the absorbing medium and the charged radiation particle. These interactions occur continuously along the path of the incident particle until the kinetic energy of the particle is sufficiently depleted. Uncharged species (γ photons, x-rays) undergo a single event per photon, totally consuming the energy of the photon and leading to the ejection of an electron from a single atom. Electrons with sufficient energy proceed to interact with the absorbing medium identically to β radiation.

An important factor that distinguishes different radiation types from one another is the linear energy transfer (LET), which is the rate at which the radiation loses energy with distance traveled through the absorber. Low LET species are usually low mass, either photons or electron mass species (β particles, positrons) and interact sparsely along their path through the absorber, leading to isolated regions of reactive radical species. High LET species are usually greater in mass than one electron, for example α particles, and lose energy rapidly resulting in a cluster of ionization events in close proximity to one another. Consequently, the heavy particle travels a relatively short distance from its origin.

Areas containing a high concentration of reactive species following absorption of energy from radiation are referred to as spurs. In a medium irradiated with low LET radiation, the spurs are sparsely distributed across the track and are unable to interact. For high LET radiation, the spurs can overlap, allowing for inter-spur reactions, leading to different yields of products when compared to the same medium irradiated with the same energy of low LET radiation.

== Reduction of organics by solvated electrons ==
A recent area of work has been the destruction of toxic organic compounds by irradiation; after irradiation, "dioxins" (polychlorodibenzo-p-dioxins) are dechlorinated in the same way as PCBs can be converted to biphenyl and inorganic chloride. This is because the solvated electrons react with the organic compound to form a radical anion, which decomposes by the loss of a chloride anion. If a deoxygenated mixture of PCBs in isopropanol or mineral oil is irradiated with gamma rays, then the PCBs will be dechlorinated to form inorganic chloride and biphenyl. The reaction works best in isopropanol if potassium hydroxide (caustic potash) is added. The base deprotonates the hydroxydimethylmethyl radical to be converted into acetone and a solvated electron, as the result the G value (yield for a given energy due to radiation deposited in the system) of chloride can be increased because the radiation now starts a chain reaction, each solvated electron formed by the action of the gamma rays can now convert more than one PCB molecule. If oxygen, acetone, nitrous oxide, sulfur hexafluoride or nitrobenzene is present in the mixture, then the reaction rate is reduced. This work has been done recently in the US, often with used nuclear fuel as the radiation source.

In addition to the work on the destruction of aryl chlorides, it has been shown that aliphatic chlorine and bromine compounds such as perchloroethylene, Freon (1,1,2-trichloro-1,2,2-trifluoroethane) and halon-2402 (1,2-dibromo-1,1,2,2-tetrafluoroethane) can be dehalogenated by the action of radiation on alkaline isopropanol solutions. Again a chain reaction has been reported.

In addition to the work on the reduction of organic compounds by irradiation, some work on the radiation induced oxidation of organic compounds has been reported. For instance, the use of radiogenic hydrogen peroxide (formed by irradiation) to remove sulfur from coal has been reported. In this study it was found that the addition of manganese dioxide to the coal increased the rate of sulfur removal. The degradation of nitrobenzene under both reducing and oxidizing conditions in water has been reported.

== Reduction of metal compounds ==
In addition to the reduction of organic compounds by the solvated electrons it has been reported that upon irradiation a pertechnetate solution at pH 4.1 is converted to a colloid of technetium dioxide. Irradiation of a solution at pH 1.8 soluble Tc(IV) complexes are formed. Irradiation of a solution at pH 2.7 forms a mixture of the colloid and the soluble Tc(IV) compounds. Gamma irradiation has been used in the synthesis of nanoparticles of gold on iron oxide (Fe_{2}O_{3}).

It has been shown that the irradiation of aqueous solutions of lead compounds leads to the formation of elemental lead. When an inorganic solid such as bentonite and sodium formate are present then the lead is removed from the aqueous solution.

== Polymer modification ==
Another key area uses radiation chemistry to modify polymers. Using radiation, it is possible to convert monomers to polymers, to crosslink polymers, and to break polymer chains. Both man-made and natural polymers (such as carbohydrates) can be processed in this way.

== Water chemistry ==
Both the harmful effects of radiation upon biological systems (induction of cancer and acute radiation injuries) and the useful effects of radiotherapy involve the radiation chemistry of water. The vast majority of biological molecules are present in an aqueous medium; when water is exposed to radiation, the water absorbs energy, and as a result forms chemically reactive species that can interact with dissolved substances (solutes). Water is ionized to form a solvated electron and H_{2}O^{+}, the H_{2}O^{+} cation can react with water to form a hydrated proton (H_{3}O^{+}) and a hydroxyl radical (HO^{.}). Furthermore, the solvated electron can recombine with the H_{2}O^{+} cation to form an excited state of the water. This excited state then decomposes to species such as hydroxyl radicals (HO^{.}), hydrogen atoms (H^{.}) and oxygen atoms (O^{.}). Finally, the solvated electron can react with solutes such as solvated protons or oxygen molecules to form hydrogen atoms and dioxygen radical anions, respectively. The fact that oxygen changes the radiation chemistry might be one reason why oxygenated tissues are more sensitive to irradiation than the deoxygenated tissue at the center of a tumor. The free radicals, such as the hydroxyl radical, chemically modify biomolecules such as DNA, leading to damage such as breaks in the DNA strands. Some substances can protect against radiation-induced damage by reacting with the reactive species generated by the irradiation of the water.

The reactive species generated by the radiation can take part in following reactions; this is similar to the idea of the non-electrochemical reactions which follow the electrochemical event which is observed in cyclic voltammetry when a non-reversible event occurs. For example, the SF_{5} radical formed by the reaction of solvated electrons and SF_{6} undergo further reactions which lead to the formation of hydrogen fluoride and sulfuric acid.

In water, the dimerization reaction of hydroxyl radicals can form hydrogen peroxide, while in saline systems the reaction of the hydroxyl radicals with chloride anions forms hypochlorite anions.

The action of radiation upon underground water is responsible for the formation of hydrogen which is converted by bacteria into methane.

== Equipment ==
=== Radiation chemistry applied in industrial processing equipment ===
To process materials, either a gamma source or an electron beam can be used. The international type IV (wet storage) irradiator is a common design, of which the JS6300 and JS6500 gamma sterilizers (made by 'Nordion International', which used to trade as 'Atomic Energy of Canada Ltd') are typical examples. In these irradiation plants, the source is stored in a deep well filled with water when not in use. When the source is required, it is moved by a steel wire to the irradiation room where the products which are to be treated are present; these objects are placed inside boxes which are moved through the room by an automatic mechanism. By moving the boxes from one point to another, the contents are given a uniform dose. After treatment, the product is moved by the automatic mechanism out of the room. The irradiation room has very thick concrete walls (about 3 m thick) to prevent gamma rays from escaping. The source consists of ^{60}Co rods sealed within two layers of stainless steel. The rods are combined with inert dummy rods to form a rack with a total activity of about 12.6PBq (340kCi).

=== Research equipment ===
While it is possible to do some types of research using an irradiator much like that used for gamma sterilization, it is common in some areas of science to use a time resolved experiment where a material is subjected to a pulse of radiation (normally electrons from a LINAC). After the pulse of radiation, the concentration of different substances within the material are measured by emission spectroscopy or Absorption spectroscopy, hence the rates of reactions can be determined. This allows the relative abilities of substances to react with the reactive species generated by the action of radiation on the solvent (commonly water) to be measured. This experiment is known as pulse radiolysis which is closely related to flash photolysis.

In the latter experiment the sample is excited by a pulse of light to examine the decay of the excited states by spectroscopy; sometimes the formation of new compounds can be investigated. Flash photolysis experiments have led to a better understanding of the effects of halogen-containing compounds upon the ozone layer.

== Chemosensor ==
The SAW chemosensor is nonionic and nonspecific. It directly measures the total mass of each chemical compound as it exits the gas chromatography column and condenses on the crystal surface, thus causing a change in the fundamental acoustic frequency of the crystal. Odor concentration is directly measured with this integrating type of detector. Column flux is obtained from a microprocessor that continuously calculates the derivative of the SAW frequency.

== See also ==
- Radiolysis
- Milton Burton
