= Molly Scott Cato =

British economist and Member of the European Parliament

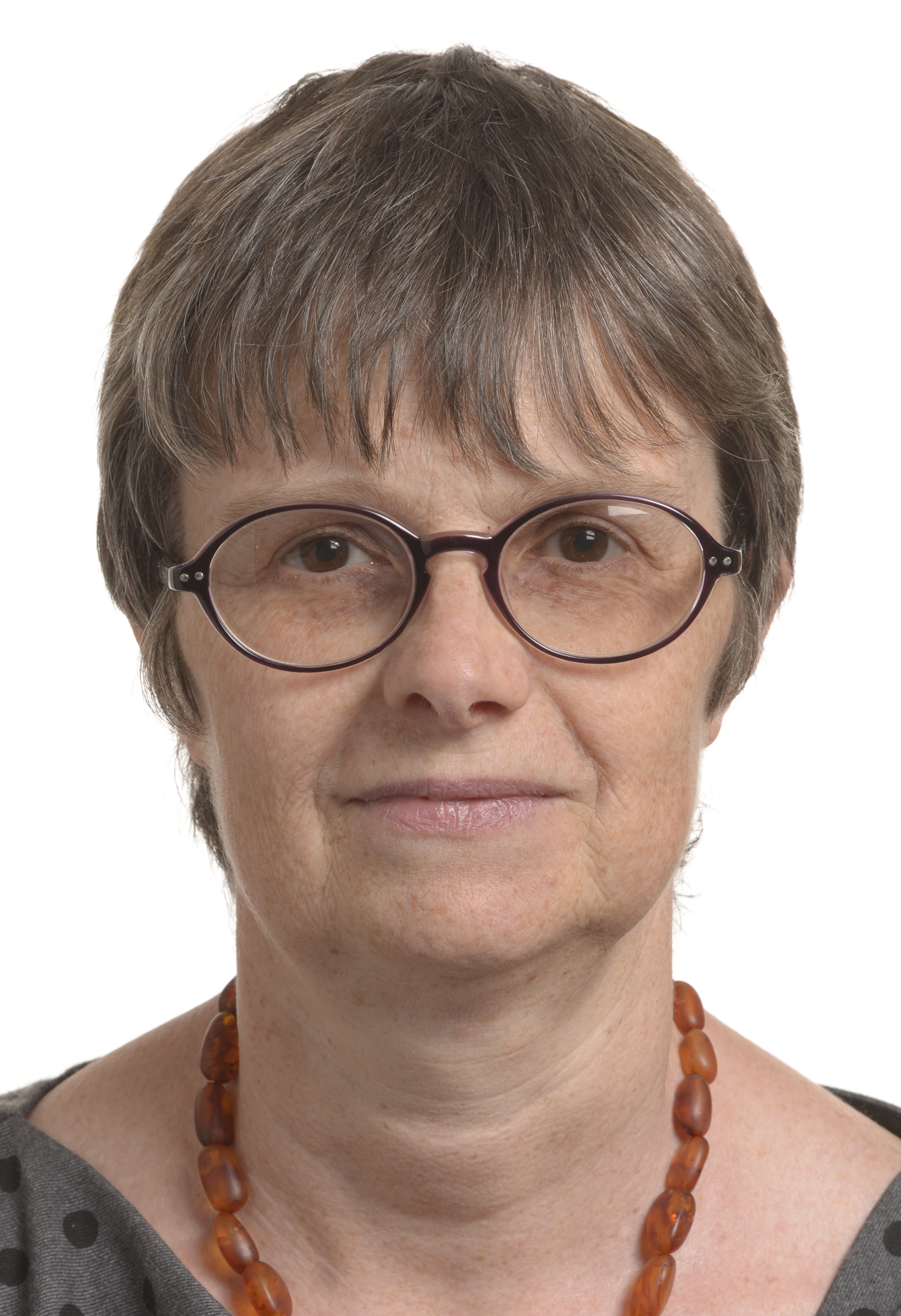

Member of the European Parliament for South West England
- In office 1 July 2014 – 31 January 2020
- Succeeded by: Constituency abolished

Personal details
- Born: 21 May 1963 (age 63)
- Party: Green Party of England and Wales
- Domestic partner: Christopher Busby (approx 1992–2004)
- Children: 3 (2 sons, 1 daughter)
- Education: University of Oxford (BA/MA); Open University (MSc); Aberystwyth University (PhD)
- Profession: Green economist, green politician
- Website: greeneconomist.org

Sarah Margaret "Molly" Scott Cato (born 21 May 1963) is a British Green politician, economist and activist. She served as a Member of the European Parliament (MEP) for South West England (Note: The South West England electoral region included the British Overseas Territory of Gibraltar.) from 2014 to 2020. From 2012, until her election as an MEP, she was Professor of Strategy and Sustainability at the University of Roehampton. Scott Cato spoke for the Green Party on finance and the EU, and is known for her work in the field of co-operative studies. She has published on green economics, localism and anti-capitalism, and has contributed to works on the risks of nuclear power, the use of which she strongly opposes.

== Early life and education ==
Molly Scott Cato was born on 21 May 1963 and was educated at Bath High School for Girls, before reading Philosophy, Politics and Economics (PPE) at Oxford. After working in the publishing industry, in 2001 she earned her Ph.D. from the University of Wales, Aberystwyth (now Aberystwyth University) with a thesis on employment policy in the South Wales Valleys, including research into the Tower Colliery workers' co-operative. Her book, The Pit and the Pendulum, is based on this research. She holds an MSc in advanced social research methods from the Open University.

== Academic career ==
After working for the Oxford University Press from 1987 to 1998, Scott Cato tutored at Aberystwyth University in 2000, then, from 2001 to 2012, was Senior lecturer and Reader in green economics at Cardiff Metropolitan University (known for most of that period as the University of Wales Institute, Cardiff, or UWIC for short). In 2007 she was appointed Director of the Cardiff Institute for Co-operative Studies. In 2012 she became Professor of Strategy and Sustainability at the University of Roehampton.

Scott Cato's academic work covers three main areas: firstly the green economy, that is, one which recognises planetary limits and achieves social justice; secondly the economics of co-operatives and social enterprises, and finally critical analysis of the existing monetary system, and alternatives which might replace it.

=== Publications ===
She has published widely on green economics, localism and anti-capitalism. She wrote Seven Myths About Work in 1996, updating it in 2002 under the title Arbeit Macht Frei and Other Lies about Work. She co-edited Green Economics: Beyond Supply and Demand to Meeting People's Needs in 1999 with Miriam Kennet. Her report, co-authored with Christopher Busby and Richard Bramhall, on the structure of government specialist science advice committees, I Don't Know Much About Science, apparently "influenced the structure of the government's new committee examining the effects of low-level radiation".

In 2009 she published Green Economics: An Introduction to Theory, Policy and Practice, where she argues that society should be embedded within the ecosystem, and that markets and economies are social structures that should respond to social and environmental priorities. She includes examples of effective green policies that are already being implemented across the world policy prescriptions for issues including climate change, localization, citizens' income, economic measurement, ecotaxes and trade. In his review of the book in the Journal of Economic Geography Danny Dorling called it "a serious book written by the grown-up version of the kinds of people who are currently invading airports, chaining themselves to those coal trucks on the way to power stations and populating climate camps".

Her 2011 book Environment and Economy describes the main academic responses to the need to resolve the tension between economy and environment: environmental economics, ecological economics, green economics, and anti-capitalist economics. It covers topics including an introduction to economic instruments such as taxes and regulation; pollution and resource depletion; growth; globalization vs. localization and climate change.

== Political career ==
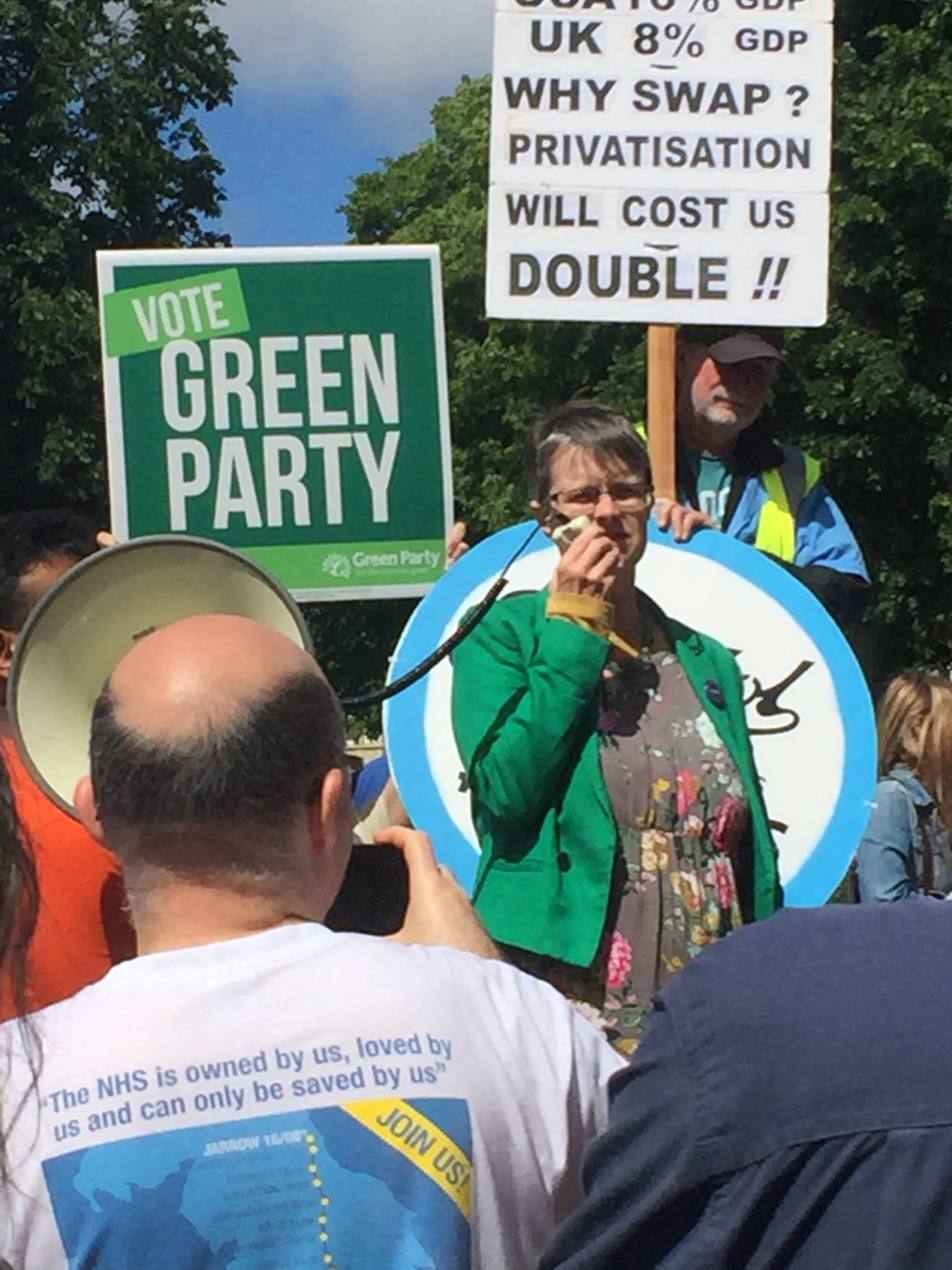
Scott Cato campaigning to contest the Bristol West seat in 2017

Scott Cato joined the UK Green Party in 1988, before it became three separate parties for England and Wales, Scotland and Northern Ireland in 1990. She has been Co-Chair of the Green Party Regional Council and served on the Green Party Executive as Campaigns Co-ordinator. She wrote Seven Myths About Work as part of a Green Party campaign, Why Work?. She spoke for the Green Party on finance and the EU.

=== Candidate for the UK Parliament ===
Scott Cato stood as the Green Party candidate for the Preseli Pembrokeshire constituency at the 1997 and 2005 general elections, coming sixth. For 2017, Scott Cato was selected by the party to stand for the constituency which saw its greatest-swing result in 2015, Bristol West, where the party had been placed second – a seat with a high student and academic contingent to its electorate. She was endorsed by Hugh Fearnley-Whittingstall. She finished in third place in the 2017 election, with the Green share of the vote dropping from 26.8% to 12.9%.

In the 2019 election, she stood in Stroud, with the Liberal Democrats standing down in the constituency and endorsing her as the Unite to Remain candidate. She came third, with 4,954 votes, 7.5% of the total and up 5.3% from 2017.

=== Local council ===
In May 2011, Scott Cato was elected to represent Valley Ward on Stroud District Council. In May 2012, she became leader of the Green Group on the council and made an agreement with the Labour and Liberal Democrat groups to take overall control of the council, calling for "constructive co-operation" and rejecting the "tribalism of party politics" in favour of a "more inclusive" approach. She said, "We believe that no one party has a monopoly on good ideas and we will seek co-operation to achieve advances of our policy platform on an issue-by-issue basis." She became chairman of the council's Audit and Standards Committee in May 2013. At the council's AGM in June 2014, Scott Cato announced her resignation, to take effect from 1 July, the start of her mandate in the European Parliament.

=== European Parliament ===
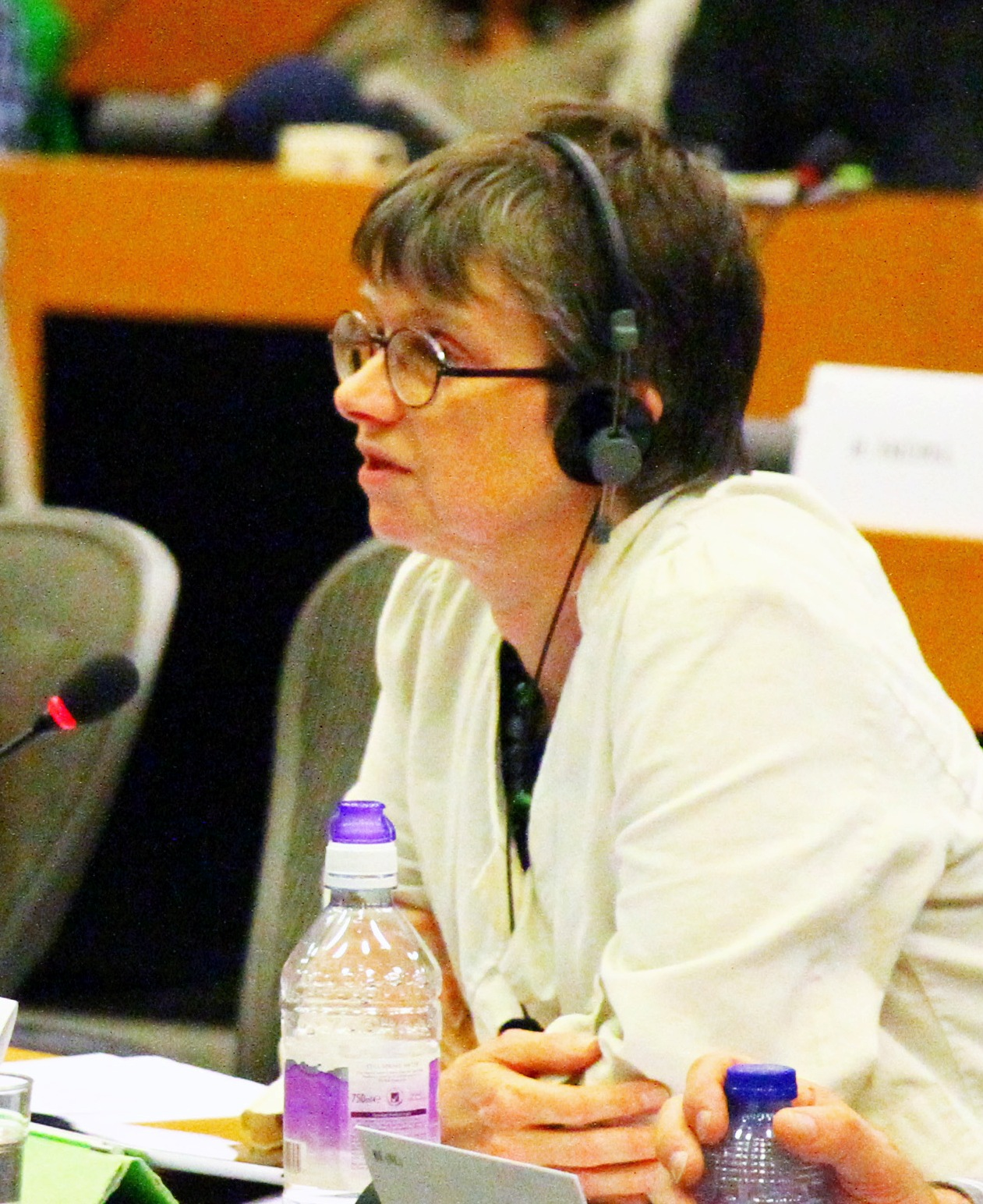
Scott Cato questioning Jean-Claude Juncker at an open hearing hosted by the Green-EFA group on 9 July 2014

In the May 2014 elections for the European Parliament, she was elected as an MEP in South West England for the Green Party, being the lead candidate on the party's list. The Green Party's share of the vote in her region was, at 11.1%, the highest of any electoral region. She had stood for the European Parliament on the Green Party list for the South West region at the previous election in 2009; in 1999 and 2004 she had been on the Green Party list in Wales. She stated, after her election, that her priorities as an MEP would be finance and farming: "I'm from the South West – it's vital to our region, and I hope to get farming working in a more socially and environmentally friendly way".

On 1 July 2014, the start of her mandate, she was appointed a full member of the Parliament's Committee on Economic and Monetary Affairs and a substitute member of the Committee on Agriculture and Rural Development. In her first speech, also on 1 July, she expressed her opposition to the UK government's attempt to take away from her region control of £450 million EU convergence funding, saying: "Cornwall and the Isles of Scilly have a long history of using these funds efficiently and effectively".

In May 2019, Scott Cato was re-elected in the 2019 European elections. She was the only Green MEP in the South West England constituency and was elected on a vote share of 18.1% (up 7% from 2014).

== Localism and community involvement ==
In addition to her work on Stroud District Council, Scott Cato has, since 2007, been a director of Stroud Common Wealth, a not-for-profit private company, limited by guarantee, which owns and develops property "for community benefit and to enable social enterprise development." She was a director from 2009 to 2012 of Transition Stroud, which aims to strengthen the community's local economy, to reduce dependence on fossil fuel and to prepare for climate change. Transition Stroud is part of the Transition Towns network. Shortly after she moved to Stroud in 2006, she joined Stroud Community Agriculture (SCA), and was elected to its "core group" of members. SCA is a community-supported agriculture project, organised as a co-operative, which provides locally produced organic food for its members.

In 2009, Scott Cato was one of the founders of the Stroud pound. In 2012, she had an article about local currency published in the International Journal of Community Currency Research.

== Other activities ==
Scott Cato was a member of the Management Committee of the Association for Heterodox Economics from 2010 to 2014 and is on the Editorial Board of the Journal of Co-operative Studies, published by the UK Society for Co-operative Studies. She formerly served as a member of the Advisory Group of the Equality Trust. She was, from November 2010 to September 2013, a director and trustee of Meadow Prospect, the charitable branch of RCT Homes, a large social housing provider based in Rhondda Cynon Taf (RCT), and itself an Industrial and provident society with charitable rules. She is a Distinguished Fellow of the Schumacher Institute.

Together with Patrick Adams and her then partner, Christopher Busby, she founded Green Audit, an environmental consultancy and publishing organisation, in 1992, but later left the organisation, which continues to be run under Busby's direction.

Scott Cato supports the EU boycott of goods from illegal Israeli settlements beyond the Green Line, thinks that this boycott should be widened, and supports measures to ensure that the illegal settlements should be excluded from EU relations with Israel. Her sympathy for the Palestinians dates back to time spent teaching in the West Bank when she was a student.

In October 2018, she signed the call to action supporting Extinction Rebellion.

== Personal life ==
Scott Cato is a Quaker. She has three children and lives in Stroud, Gloucestershire.

== Bibliography ==
by Molly Scott Cato

- Scott Cato, Molly (2014). Can't Pay? Won't Pay! Debt, the Myth of Austerity, and the Failure of Green Investment (PDF). Weymouth: Green House. ISBN 978-0-9573738-6-0.
- ——————— (2013). The Bioregional Economy: Land, Liberty and the Pursuit of Happiness. Routledge. ISBN 978-0-415-50082-1.
- ——————— (2013a). The Paradox of Green Keynesianism (PDF). Weymouth: Green House. ISBN 978-0-9573738-5-3.
- ——————— (2012). Local Liquidity: From Ineffective Demand to Community Currencies (PDF). Weymouth: Green House. ISBN 978-0-9573738-0-8.
- ——————— (2011). Environment and Economy. Routledge. ISBN 978-0-415-47741-3.
- ——————— (2007). "Green and Pleasant Land: Building Strong and Sustainable Local Economies in Wales". Contemporary Wales. 19. ISBN 978-095149372-4.
- ——————— (2009). Green Economics: An Introduction to Theory, Policy and Practice. Earthscan. ISBN 978-184407571-3 – via Internet Archive.
- ——————— (2006). Market, Schmarket: Building the Post-Capitalist Economy. New Clarion Press. ISBN 978-1-873797-51-8.
- ——————— (2004). The Pit and the Pendulum: A Co-operative Future for Work in the South Wales Valleys. University of Wales Press. ISBN 978-0-7083-1869-0.
- ——————— (2002). Arbeit Macht Frei and Other Lies about Work (PDF). Aberystwyth: Green Audit. ISBN 1-897761-23-6. Archived from the original (PDF) on 11 October 2008.
- ——————— (1996). Seven Myths About Work. Aberystwyth: Green Audit. ISBN 978-1-897761-13-7.

with other authors

- Scott Cato, Molly; Heatley, Brian (2012). Free universities! Re-configuring the Finance and Governance Models of the UK Higher Education Sector (PDF). Weymouth: Green House. ISBN 978-0-9569545-5-8.
- Scott Cato, Molly; Heatley, Brian (2011). Mutual Security in a Sustainable Economy A Green Approach to Welfare (PDF). Weymouth: Green House. ISBN 978-0-9569545-2-7.
- Busby, Chris; Bertell, Rosalie; Schmitz-Feuerhake, Inge; Yablokov, Alexey; Scott Cato, Molly (2010). ECRR 2010 Recommendations of the European Committee on Radiation Risk. Aberystwyth: Green Audit on behalf of ECRR. ISBN 978-189776116-8. online at archive.org
- Scott Cato, Molly; Busby, Christopher; Bramhall, Richard (2002). I Don't Know Much About Science Political Decision-Making Involving Science and Technology. Aberystwyth: Green Audit.
- Scott Cato, Molly; Kennet, Miriam, eds. (1999). Green Economics: Beyond Supply and Demand to Meeting People's Needs. Aberystwyth: Green Audit. ISBN 1-897761-18-X.

Papers and articles

- List of scholarly papers at SSRN
- List of recent articles

== See also ==
- List of members of the European Parliament for the United Kingdom, 2019–20
- List of members of the European Parliament for the United Kingdom, 2014–2019
- Energiewende in Germany
- List of peace activists
