= Radiobiology =

Study of effects of radiation on living tissues

Radiobiology (also known as radiation biology, and uncommonly as actinobiology) is a field of clinical and basic medical sciences that involves the study of the effects of radiation on living tissue (including ionizing and non-ionizing radiation), in particular the health effects of radiation.

Ionizing radiation is generally harmful and potentially lethal to living things but can have health benefits in radiation therapy for the treatment of cancer and thyrotoxicosis. Its most common impact is the induction of cancer with a latent period of years or decades after exposure. High doses can cause visually dramatic radiation burns, and/or rapid fatality through acute radiation syndrome. Controlled doses are used for medical imaging and radiotherapy.

== Health effects ==
In general, ionizing radiation is harmful and potentially lethal to living beings but can have health benefits in radiation therapy for the treatment of cancer and thyrotoxicosis.

Most adverse health effects of radiation exposure may be grouped in two general categories:

- deterministic effects (harmful tissue reactions) due in large part to the killing or malfunction of cells following high doses; and
- stochastic effects, i.e., cancer and heritable effects involving either cancer development in exposed individuals owing to mutation of somatic cells or heritable disease in their offspring owing to mutation of reproductive (germ) cells.

=== Stochastic ===
Some effects of ionizing radiation on human health are stochastic, meaning that their probability of occurrence increases with dose, while the severity is independent of dose. Radiation-induced cancer, teratogenesis, cognitive decline, and heart disease are all stochastic effects induced by ionizing radiation.

Its most common impact is the stochastic induction of cancer with a latent period of years or decades after exposure. The mechanism by which this occurs is well understood, but quantitative models predicting the level of risk remain controversial. The most widely accepted model posits that the incidence of cancers due to ionizing radiation increases linearly with effective radiation dose at a rate of 5.5% per sievert. If this linear model is correct, then natural background radiation is the most hazardous source of radiation to general public health, followed by medical imaging as a close second.

Quantitative data on the effects of ionizing radiation on human health is relatively limited compared to other medical conditions because of the low number of cases to date, and because of the stochastic nature of some of the effects. Stochastic effects can only be measured through large epidemiological studies where enough data has been collected to remove confounding factors such as smoking habits and other lifestyle factors. The richest source of high-quality data comes from the study of Japanese atomic bomb survivors. In vitro and animal experiments are informative, but radioresistance varies greatly across species.

The added lifetime risk of developing cancer by a single abdominal CT of 8 mSv is estimated to be 0.05%, or 1 in 2,000.

=== Deterministic ===
Deterministic effects are those that reliably occur above a threshold dose, and their severity increases with dose.

High radiation dose gives rise to deterministic effects which reliably occur above a threshold, and their severity increases with dose. Deterministic effects are not necessarily more or less serious than stochastic effects; either can ultimately lead to a temporary nuisance or a fatality. Examples of deterministic effects are:

- Acute radiation syndrome, by acute whole-body radiation
- Radiation burns, from radiation to a particular body surface
- Radiation-induced thyroiditis, a potential side effect from radiation treatment against hyperthyroidism
- Chronic radiation syndrome, from long-term radiation.
- Radiation-induced lung injury, from for example radiation therapy to the lungs
- Cataracts and infertility

The US National Academy of Sciences Biological Effects of Ionizing Radiation Committee "has concluded that there is no compelling evidence to indicate a dose threshold below which the risk of tumor induction is zero".

Phase	Symptom	Whole-body absorbed dose (Gy)				
Phase	Symptom	1–2 Gy	2–6 Gy	6–8 Gy	8–30 Gy	> 30 Gy
Immediate	Nausea and vomiting	5–50%	50–100%	75–100%	90–100%	100%
Immediate	Time of onset	2–6 h	1–2 h	10–60 min	< 10 min	Minutes
Immediate	Duration	< 24 h	24–48 h	< 48 h	< 48 h	—N/a (patients die in < 48 h)
Immediate	Diarrhea	None	None to mild (< 10%)	Heavy (> 10%)	Heavy (> 95%)	Heavy (100%)
Immediate	Time of onset	—	3–8 h	1–3 h	< 1 h	< 1 h
Immediate	Headache	Slight	Mild to moderate (50%)	Moderate (80%)	Severe (80–90%)	Severe (100%)
Immediate	Time of onset	—	4–24 h	3–4 h	1–2 h	< 1 h
Immediate	Fever	None	Moderate increase (10–100%)	Moderate to severe (100%)	Severe (100%)	Severe (100%)
Immediate	Time of onset	—	1–3 h	< 1 h	< 1 h	< 1 h
Immediate	CNS function	No impairment	Cognitive impairment 6–20 h	Cognitive impairment > 24 h	Rapid incapacitation	Seizures, tremor, ataxia, lethargy
Latent period		28–31 days	7–28 days	< 7 days	None	None
Illness		Mild to moderate leukopenia Fatigue; Weakness	Moderate to severe leukopenia Purpura; Hemorrhage; Infections; Alopecia after 3 Gy	Severe leukopenia High fever Diarrhea; Vomiting; Dizziness and disorientation Hypotension; Electrolyte disturbance	Nausea; Vomiting; Severe diarrhea High fever Electrolyte disturbance Shock	—N/a (patients die in < 48h)
Mortality	Without care	0–5%	5–95%	95–100%	100%	100%
Mortality	With care	0–5%	5–50%	50–100%	99–100%	100%
Mortality	Death	6–8 weeks	4–6 weeks	2–4 weeks	2 days – 2 weeks	1–2 days
Table source

=== By type of radiation ===
When alpha particle emitting isotopes are ingested, they are far more dangerous than their half-life or decay rate would suggest. This is due to the high relative biological effectiveness of alpha radiation to cause biological damage after alpha-emitting radioisotopes enter living cells. Ingested alpha emitter radioisotopes such as transuranics or actinides are an average of about 20 times more dangerous, and in some experiments up to 1000 times more dangerous than an equivalent activity of beta emitting or gamma emitting radioisotopes. If the radiation type is not known, it can be determined by differential measurements in the presence of electrical fields, magnetic fields, or with varying amounts of shielding.

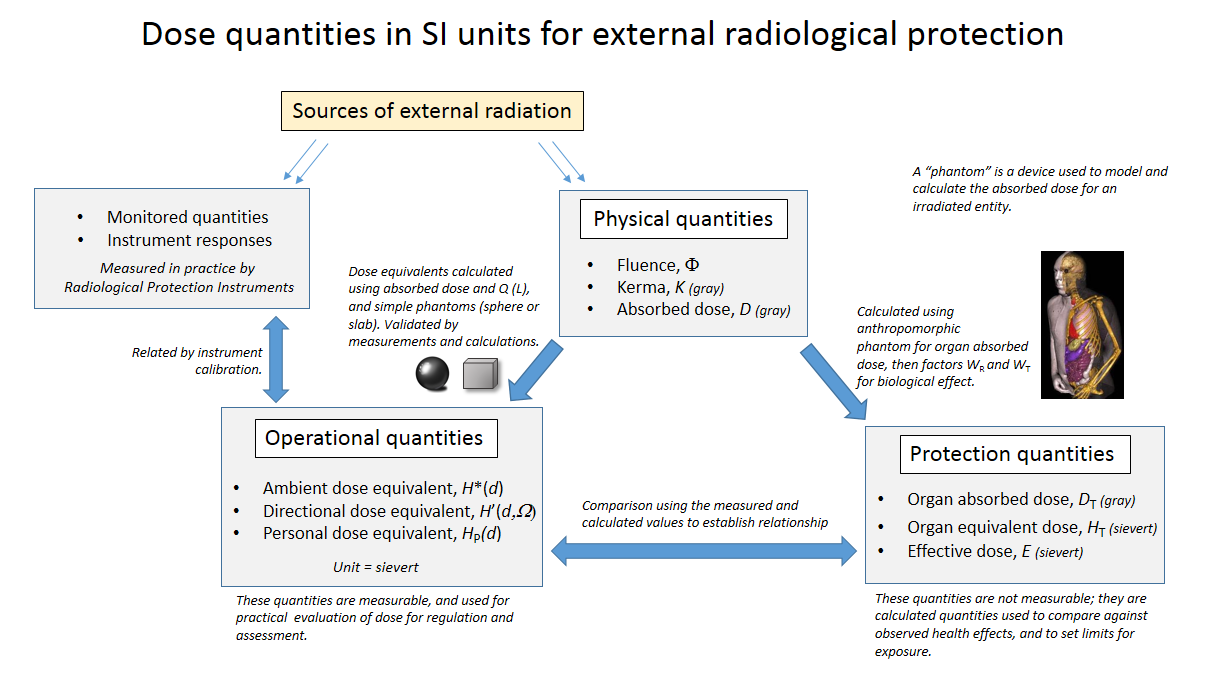
External dose quantities used in radiation protection. See article on sievert on how these are calculated and used.

=== In pregnancy ===
The risk for developing radiation-induced cancer at some point in life is greater when exposing a fetus than an adult, both because the cells are more vulnerable when they are growing, and because there is much longer lifespan after the dose to develop cancer. If there is too much radiation exposure there could be harmful effects on the unborn child or reproductive organs. Research shows that scanning more than once in nine months can harm the unborn child.

Possible deterministic effects include of radiation exposure in pregnancy include miscarriage, structural birth defects, growth restriction and intellectual disability. The deterministic effects have been studied at for example survivors of the atomic bombings of Hiroshima and Nagasaki and cases where radiation therapy has been necessary during pregnancy:

Gestational age	Embryonic age	Effects	Estimated threshold dose (mGy)
2 to 4 weeks	0 to 2 weeks	Miscarriage or none (all or nothing)	50 - 100
4 to 10 weeks	2 to 8 weeks	Structural birth defects	200
4 to 10 weeks	2 to 8 weeks	Growth restriction	200 - 250
10 to 17 weeks	8 to 15 weeks	Severe intellectual disability	60 - 310
18 to 27 weeks	16 to 25 weeks	Severe intellectual disability (lower risk)	250 - 280

The intellectual deficit has been estimated to be about 25 IQ points per 1,000 mGy at 10 to 17 weeks of gestational age.

These effects are sometimes relevant when deciding about medical imaging in pregnancy, since projectional radiography and CT scanning exposes the fetus to radiation.

Also, the risk for the mother of later acquiring radiation-induced breast cancer seems to be particularly high for radiation doses during pregnancy.

== Measurement ==
The human body cannot sense ionizing radiation except in very high doses, but the effects of ionization can be used to characterize the radiation. Parameters of interest include disintegration rate, particle flux, particle type, beam energy, kerma, dose rate, and radiation dose.

The monitoring and calculation of doses to safeguard human health is called dosimetry and is undertaken within the science of health physics. Key measurement tools are the use of dosimeters to give the external effective dose uptake and the use of bio-assay for ingested dose. The article on the sievert summarises the recommendations of the ICRU and ICRP on the use of dose quantities and includes a guide to the effects of ionizing radiation as measured in sieverts, and gives examples of approximate figures of dose uptake in certain situations.

The committed dose is a measure of the stochastic health risk due to an intake of radioactive material into the human body. The ICRP states "For internal exposure, committed effective doses are generally determined from an assessment of the intakes of radionuclides from bioassay measurements or other quantities. The radiation dose is determined from the intake using recommended dose coefficients".

=== Absorbed, equivalent and effective dose ===
The absorbed dose is a physical dose quantity D representing the mean energy imparted to matter per unit mass by ionizing radiation. In the SI system of units, the unit of measure is joules per kilogram, and its special name is gray (Gy). The non-SI CGS unit rad is sometimes also used, predominantly in the USA.

To represent stochastic risk the equivalent dose H _{T} and effective dose E are used, and appropriate dose factors and coefficients are used to calculate these from the absorbed dose. Equivalent and effective dose quantities are expressed in units of the sievert or rem which implies that biological effects have been taken into account. These are usually in accordance with the recommendations of the International Committee on Radiation Protection (ICRP) and International Commission on Radiation Units and Measurements (ICRU). The coherent system of radiological protection quantities developed by them is shown in the accompanying diagram.

== Organizations ==
The International Commission on Radiological Protection (ICRP) manages the International System of Radiological Protection, which sets recommended limits for dose uptake. Dose values may represent absorbed, equivalent, effective, or committed dose.

Other important organizations studying the topic include:

- International Commission on Radiation Units and Measurements (ICRU)
- United Nations Scientific Committee on the Effects of Atomic Radiation (UNSCEAR)
- US National Council on Radiation Protection and Measurements (NCRP)
- UK UK Health Security Agency
- US National Academy of Sciences (NAS through the BEIR studies)
- French Institut de radioprotection et de sûreté nucléaire (IRSN)
- European Committee on Radiation Risk (ECRR)

== Exposure pathways ==
=== External ===
A schematic diagram showing a rectangle being irradiated by an external source (in red) of radiation (shown in yellow)

A schematic diagram showing a rectangle being irradiated by radioactive contamination (shown in red) which is present on an external surface such as the skin; this emits radiation (shown in yellow), which can enter the animal's body

External exposure is exposure which occurs when the radioactive source (or other radiation source) is outside (and remains outside) the organism which is exposed. Examples of external exposure include:

- A person who places a sealed radioactive source in his pocket
- A space traveller who is irradiated by cosmic rays
- A person who is treated for cancer by either teletherapy or brachytherapy. While in brachytherapy the source is inside the person it is still considered external exposure because it does not result in a committed dose.
- A nuclear worker whose hands have been dirtied with radioactive dust. Assuming that his hands are cleaned before any radioactive material can be absorbed, inhaled or ingested, skin contamination is considered to be external exposure.

External exposure is relatively easy to estimate, and the irradiated organism does not become radioactive, except for a case where the radiation is an intense neutron beam which causes activation.

==== By type of medical imaging ====
Effective dose by medical imaging type
Target organs	Exam type	Effective dose in adults	Equivalent time of background radiation
CT of the head	Single series	2 mSv	8 months
CT of the head	With + without radiocontrast	4 mSv	16 months
Chest	CT of the chest	7 mSv	2 years
Chest	CT of the chest, lung cancer screening protocol	1.5 mSv	6 months
Chest	Chest X-ray	0.1 mSv	10 days
Heart	Coronary CT angiography	12 mSv	4 years
Heart	Coronary CT calcium scan	3 mSv	1 year
Abdominal	CT of abdomen and pelvis	10 mSv	3 years
Abdominal	CT of abdomen and pelvis, low dose protocol	3 mSv	1 year
Abdominal	CT of abdomen and pelvis, with + without radiocontrast	20 mSv	7 years
Abdominal	CT Colonography	6 mSv	2 years
Abdominal	Intravenous pyelogram	3 mSv	1 year
Abdominal	Upper gastrointestinal series	6 mSv	2 years
Abdominal	Lower gastrointestinal series	8 mSv	3 years
Spine	Spine X-ray	1.5 mSv	6 months
Spine	CT of the spine	6 mSv	2 years
Extremities	X-ray of extremity	0.001 mSv	3 hours
Extremities	Lower extremity CT angiography	0.3 - 1.6 mSv	5 weeks - 6 months
Dental X-ray		0.005 mSv	1 day
DEXA (bone density)		0.001 mSv	3 hours
PET-CT combination		25 mSv	8 years
Mammography		0.4 mSv	7 weeks

=== Internal ===
Internal exposure occurs when the radioactive material enters the organism, and the radioactive atoms become incorporated into the organism. This can occur through inhalation, ingestion, or injection. Below are a series of examples of internal exposure.

- The exposure caused by potassium-40 present within a normal person.
- The exposure to the ingestion of a soluble radioactive substance, such as ^{89}Sr in cows' milk.
- A person who is being treated for cancer by means of a radiopharmaceutical where a radioisotope is used as a drug (usually a liquid or pill). A review of this topic was published in 1999. Because the radioactive material becomes intimately mixed with the affected object it is often difficult to decontaminate the object or person in a case where internal exposure is occurring. While some very insoluble materials such as fission products within a uranium dioxide matrix might never be able to truly become part of an organism, it is normal to consider such particles in the lungs and digestive tract as a form of internal contamination which results in internal exposure.
- Boron neutron capture therapy (BNCT) involves injecting a boron-10 tagged chemical that preferentially binds to tumor cells. Neutrons from a nuclear reactor are shaped by a neutron moderator to the neutron energy spectrum suitable for BNCT treatment. The tumor is selectively bombarded with these neutrons. The neutrons quickly slow down in the body to become low energy thermal neutrons. These thermal neutrons are captured by the injected boron-10, forming excited (boron-11) which breaks down into lithium-7 and a helium-4 alpha particle both of these produce closely spaced ionizing radiation. This concept is described as a binary system using two separate components for the therapy of cancer. Each component in itself is relatively harmless to the cells, but when combined for treatment they produce a highly cytocidal (cytotoxic) effect which is lethal (within a limited range of 5-9 micrometers or approximately one cell diameter). Clinical trials, with promising results, are currently carried out in Finland and Japan.

When radioactive compounds enter the human body, the effects are different from those resulting from exposure to an external radiation source. Especially in the case of alpha radiation, which normally does not penetrate the skin, the exposure can be much more damaging after ingestion or inhalation. The radiation exposure is normally expressed as a committed dose.

== History ==
Although radiation was discovered in late 19th century, the dangers of radioactivity and of radiation were not immediately recognized. Acute effects of radiation were first observed in the use of X-rays when German physicist Wilhelm Röntgen intentionally subjected his fingers to X-rays in 1895. He published his observations concerning the burns that developed, though he misattributed them to ozone, a free radical produced in air by X-rays. Other free radicals produced within the body are now understood to be more important. His injuries healed later.

As a field of medical sciences, radiobiology originated from Leopold Freund's 1896 demonstration of the therapeutic treatment of a hairy mole using the newly discovered form of electromagnetic radiation called X-rays. After irradiating frogs and insects with X-rays in early 1896, Ivan Romanovich Tarkhanov concluded that these newly discovered rays not only photograph, but also "affect the living function". At the same time, Pierre and Marie Curie discovered the radioactive polonium and radium later used to treat cancer.

The genetic effects of radiation, including the effects on cancer risk, were recognized much later. In 1927 Hermann Joseph Muller published research showing genetic effects, and in 1946 was awarded the Nobel Prize for his findings.

More generally, the 1930s saw attempts to develop a general model for radiobiology. Notable here was Douglas Lea, whose presentation also included an exhaustive review of some 400 supporting publications.

Before the biological effects of radiation were known, many physicians and corporations had begun marketing radioactive substances as patent medicine and radioactive quackery. Examples were radium enema treatments, and radium-containing waters to be drunk as tonics. Marie Curie spoke out against this sort of treatment, warning that the effects of radiation on the human body were not well understood. Curie later died of aplastic anemia caused by radiation poisoning. Eben Byers, a famous American socialite, died of multiple cancers (but not acute radiation syndrome) in 1932 after consuming large quantities of radium over several years; his death drew public attention to dangers of radiation. By the 1930s, after a number of cases of bone necrosis and death in enthusiasts, radium-containing medical products had nearly vanished from the market.

In the United States, the experience of the so-called Radium Girls, where thousands of radium-dial painters contracted oral cancers— but no cases of acute radiation syndrome— popularized the warnings of occupational health associated with radiation hazards. Robley D. Evans, at MIT, developed the first standard for permissible body burden of radium, a key step in the establishment of nuclear medicine as a field of study. With the development of nuclear reactors and nuclear weapons in the 1940s, heightened scientific attention was given to the study of all manner of radiation effects.

The atomic bombings of Hiroshima and Nagasaki resulted in a large number of incidents of radiation poisoning, allowing for greater insight into its symptoms and dangers. Red Cross Hospital surgeon Dr. Terufumi Sasaki led intensive research into the Syndrome in the weeks and months following the Hiroshima bombings. Sasaki and his team were able to monitor the effects of radiation in patients of varying proximities to the blast itself, leading to the establishment of three recorded stages of the syndrome. Within 25–30 days of the explosion, the Red Cross surgeon noticed a sharp drop in white blood cell count and established this drop, along with symptoms of fever, as prognostic standards for Acute Radiation Syndrome. Actress Midori Naka, who was present during the atomic bombing of Hiroshima, was the first incident of radiation poisoning to be extensively studied. Her death on August 24, 1945, was the first death ever to be officially certified as a result of radiation poisoning (or "atomic bomb disease").

The Atomic Bomb Casualty Commission and the Radiation Effects Research Foundation have been monitoring the health status of the survivors and their descendants since 1946. They have found that radiation exposure increases cancer risk, but also that the average lifespan of survivors was reduced by only a few months compared to those not exposed to radiation. No health effects of any sort have thus far been detected in children of the survivors.

== Areas of interest ==
The interactions between organisms and electromagnetic fields (EMF) and ionizing radiation can be studied in a number of ways:

- Radiation physics
- Radiation chemistry
- Molecular and cell biology
- Molecular genetics
- Cell death and apoptosis
- High and low-level electromagnetic radiation and health
- Specific absorption rates of organisms
- Radiation poisoning
- Radiation oncology (radiation therapy in cancer)
- Bioelectromagnetics
- Electric field and magnetic field - their general nature.
- Electrophysiology - the scientific study of the electrical properties of biological cells and tissues.
- Biomagnetism - the magnetic properties of living systems (see, for example, the research of David Cohen using SQUID imaging) and Magnetobiology - the study of effect of magnets upon living systems. See also Electromagnetic radiation and health
- Bioelectromagnetism - the electromagnetic properties of living systems and Bioelectromagnetics - the study of the effect of electromagnetic fields on living systems.
- Electrotherapy
- Radiation therapy
- Radiogenomics
- Transcranial magnetic stimulation - a powerful electric current produces a transient, spatially focussed magnetic field that can penetrate the scalp and skull of a subject and induce electrical activity in the neurons on the surface of the brain.
- Magnetic resonance imaging - a very powerful magnetic field is used to obtain a 3D image of the density of water molecules of the brain, revealing different anatomical structures. A related technique, functional magnetic resonance imaging, reveals the pattern of blood flow in the brain and can show which parts of the brain are involved in a particular task.
- Embryogenesis, ontogeny and developmental biology - a discipline that has given rise to many scientific field theories.
- Bioenergetics - the study of energy exchange on the molecular level of living systems.
- Biological psychiatry, neurology, psychoneuroimmunology
- Space radiobiology is the science that investigates the effects of space radiation in biological matter. This is an interdisciplinary research, aiming to create synergies between different field (e.g. astroparticle and medical physics).

== Radiation sources for experimental radiobiology ==
Radiobiology experiments typically make use of a radiation source which could be:

- An isotopic source, typically ^{137}Cs or ^{60}Co.
- A particle accelerator generating high energy protons, electrons or charged ions. Biological samples can be irradiated using either a broad, uniform beam, or using a microbeam, focused down to cellular or subcellular sizes.
- A UV lamp.

== See also ==
- Biological effects of radiation on the epigenome
- Cell survival curve
- Health threat from cosmic rays
- NASA Space Radiation Laboratory
- Radioactivity in biology
- Radiology
- Radiophobia
- Radiosensitivity
