= Johnston Birchall =

British co-operative academic (1951–2021)

- Born: 1951
- Died: 2021 (aged 69–70)
- Occupations: Academic; Co-operator

Academic background
- Education: University of Oxford; University of York (PhD)
- Thesis: Housing Co-operatives: A Study in the Theory and Practice of User-control (1985)

Academic work
- Discipline: Co-operative studies
- Institutions: South Bank Polytechnic; Brunel University; University of Stirling

Johnston Birchall (1951–2021) was a leading British academic in the field of co-operative studies and at the time of his death Professor Emeritus at the Social Science Faculty of the University of Stirling.

== Biography ==
Birchall studied theology at the University of Oxford, before working as a community worker and a housing association manager for five years. He then completed a masters degree in sociology at the University of York, followed by a PhD in 1985 on housing co-operatives, also at York. His doctoral thesis formed the basis for his 1988 book, Building Communities: The Co-operative Way.

Birchall then worked at South Bank Polytechnic, followed by Brunel University and finally at the University of Stirling until his retirement. From 1995 to 2000 he was editor of the Journal of Co-operative Studies.

Birchall died in 2021 following a long illness. In June 2022 a special commemorative edition of the Journal of Co-operative Studies was published exploring Birchall's legacy and reprinting many of his papers.

== Publications ==
- — (1987). Save Our Shop: The Fall and Rise of the Small Co-operative Store. Manchester: Holyoake Books. ISBN 0-85195-142-2. OCLC 19126199.
- — (1988). Building Communities: The Co-operative Way. London: Routledge & Kegan Paul. ISBN 0-7102-1143-0. OCLC 16465060.
- — (1988). What Makes People Co-operate? A Strategy For Member Participation in Housing Co-operatives. Oxford: Headington. ISBN 0-9514687-0-7. OCLC 20418136.
- — (1991). The Hidden History of Co-operative Housing in Britain. London: Brunel University, Department of Government. ISBN 1-872166-56-3. OCLC 59911747.
- — (1991). Council Tenants: Sovereign Consumers or Pawns in the Game?. London: Brunel University, Department of Government. ISBN 1-872166-51-2. OCLC 84931167.
- —, ed. (1992). Housing Policy in the 1990s. London: Routledge. ISBN 0-203-32414-5. OCLC 52280818.
- — (1992). Housing Co-operatives in Britain. London: Brunel University, Department of Government. ISBN 1-872166-96-2. OCLC 28010909.
- — (1994). Co-op: The People's Business. Manchester University Press. ISBN 0-7190-4421-9. OCLC 29520554.
- — (1997). The International Co-operative Movement. Manchester University Press. ISBN 0-7190-4823-0. OCLC 37373463.
- Pollitt, Christopher; —; Putnam, Keith (1998). Decentralising Public Service Management. Basingstoke: Macmillan. ISBN 0-333-69402-3. OCLC 40383484.
- —, ed. (2002). The New Mutualism in Public Policy. Oxon: Routledge. ISBN 978-1-134-54946-7.
- — (2003). Rediscovering the Cooperative Advantage: Poverty Reduction Through Self-Help. Geneva: International Labour Office. hdl:1893/3242. ISBN 92-2-113603-5. OCLC 62700247.
- — (2004). Cooperatives and the Millennium Development Goals (PDF). Geneva: International Labour Office. ISBN 92-2-116148-X. OCLC 224463565.
- —; Ketilson, Lou Hammond (2009). Resilience of the Cooperative Business Model in Times of Crisis (PDF). Geneva: International Labour Organization. ISBN 978-92-2-122409-9. OCLC 406236822.
- — (2011). People-Centred Businesses: Co-operatives, Mutuals and the Idea of Membership. Basingstoke: Palgrave Macmillan. doi:10.1057/9780230295292. ISBN 978-0-230-21718-8. OCLC 646112058.
- — (2013). Finance In An Age of Austerity: The Power of Customer-owned Banks. Cheltenham: Edward Elgar Publishing. ISBN 978-1-78195-183-5. OCLC 828417236.
- — (2013). Resilience in a Downturn: The Power of Financial Cooperatives. Geneva: International Labour Office. ISBN 978-92-2-127031-7. OCLC 854520704.
- — (2017). The Governance of Large Co-operative Businesses. Manchester: Co-operatives UK.
