= Douglas Lea =

British experimental physicist

- Born: 8 February 1910; Liverpool, England
- Died: 16 June 1947 (aged 37)
- Education: University of Cambridge
- Scientific career
- Institutions: Strangeways Laboratory; Royal College of Surgeons
- Doctoral advisor: James Chadwick
- Other academic advisors: Ernest Rutherford

Douglas Edward Lea (February 2, 1910 – June 16, 1947) was an experimental physicist working primarily in the field of radiobiology. He started working at the Cavendish Laboratory at University of Cambridge from 1931 to 1935, and in time moved from nuclear physics to focus on biology. After obtaining his PhD from Cambridge, he worked at Strangeways Laboratory from 1935 to 1946, then at the Royal College of Surgeons between 1942 and 1946.

Lea published his influential book, The Actions of Radiation of Living Cells, in 1946, the year before he died in an accident. Lea was a major contributor to the target theory of cell death caused by ionising radiation.

For a period in 1943 he was appointed part-time Honorary Advisory Physicist to Addenbrooke's Hospital and was thus the first hospital physicist at Addenbrooke's. In 1946, not long before his death, was appointed Reader in Radiobiology in the University Department of Radiotherapeutics

A memorial lecture in his name has been given biennially since 1948. He was a close friend of fellow radiobiology pioneer, Louis Harold Gray.
