= Linear no-threshold model =

Main model used in radioprotection to minimize radiation exposures

Different assumptions on the extrapolation of the cancer risk vs. radiation dose to low-dose levels, given a known risk at a high dose: (A) supra-linearity, (B) linear (C) linear-quadratic, (D) hormesis

The linear no-threshold model (LNT) is a dose-response model used in radiation protection to estimate stochastic health effects such as radiation-induced cancer, genetic mutations and teratogenic effects on the human body due to exposure to ionizing radiation. The model assumes a linear relationship between dose and health effects, even for very low doses where biological effects are more difficult to observe. The LNT model implies that all exposure to ionizing radiation is harmful, regardless of how low the dose is, and that the effect is cumulative over a lifetime.

The LNT model is commonly used by regulatory bodies as a basis for formulating public health policies that set regulatory dose limits to protect against the effects of radiation. The validity of the LNT model, however, is disputed, and other models exist: the threshold model, which assumes that very small exposures are harmless, the radiation hormesis model, which says that radiation at very small doses can be beneficial, and the supra-linear model. It has been argued that the LNT model may have created an irrational fear of radiation.

Scientific organizations and government regulatory bodies generally support the use of the LNT model, particularly for optimization. However, some caution against estimating health effects from doses below a certain level (see § Controversy).

== Introduction ==
Stochastic health effects are those that occur by chance, and whose probability is proportional to the dose, but whose severity is independent of the dose. The LNT model assumes there is no lower threshold at which stochastic effects start, and assumes a linear relationship between dose and the stochastic health risk. In other words, LNT assumes that radiation has the potential to cause harm at any dose level, however small, and the sum of several very small exposures is just as likely to cause a stochastic health effect as a single larger exposure of equal dose value. In contrast, deterministic health effects are radiation-induced effects such as acute radiation syndrome, which are caused by tissue damage. Deterministic effects reliably occur above a threshold dose and their severity increases with dose. Because of the inherent differences, LNT is not a model for deterministic effects, which are instead characterized by other types of dose-response relationships.

LNT is a common model to calculate the probability of radiation-induced cancer both at high doses where epidemiology studies support its application, but controversially, also at low doses, which is a dose region that has a lower predictive statistical confidence. Nonetheless, regulatory bodies, such as the Nuclear Regulatory Commission (NRC), commonly use LNT as a basis for regulatory dose limits to protect against stochastic health effects, as found in many public health policies. Whether the LNT model describes the reality for small-dose exposures is disputed, and challenges to the LNT model used by NRC for setting radiation protection regulations were submitted. NRC rejected the petitions in 2021 because "they fail to present an adequate basis supporting the request to discontinue use of the LNT model".

Other dose models include: the threshold model, which assumes that very small exposures are harmless, and the radiation hormesis model, which claims that radiation at very small doses can be beneficial. Because the current data is inconclusive, scientists disagree on which model should be used, though most national and international cancer research organizations explicitly endorse LNT for regulating exposures to low dose radiation. The model is sometimes used to quantify the cancerous effect of collective doses of low-level radioactive contaminations, which is controversial. Such practice has been criticized by the International Commission on Radiological Protection since 2007.

== Origins ==
Increased Risk of Solid Cancer with Dose for A-bomb survivors, from BEIR report. Notably, this exposure pathway occurred from essentially a massive spike or pulse of radiation, a result of the brief instant that the bomb exploded, which while somewhat similar to the environment of a CT scan, is wholly unlike the low dose rate of living in a contaminated area such as Chernobyl, where the dose rate is orders of magnitude smaller. LNT does not consider dose rate and is a one size fits all approach based solely on total absorbed dose, which has not yet been verified in other settings. Likewise, it has also been pointed out that bomb survivors inhaled carcinogenic benzopyrene from the burning cities, yet this is not factored in.

The association of exposure to radiation with cancer had been observed as early as 1902, six years after the discovery of X-rays by Wilhelm Röntgen and radioactivity by Henri Becquerel. In 1927, Hermann Muller demonstrated that radiation may cause genetic mutation. He also suggested mutation as a cause of cancer. Gilbert N. Lewis and Alex Olson, based on Muller's discovery of the effect of radiation on mutation, proposed a mechanism for biological evolution in 1928, suggesting that genomic mutation was induced by cosmic and terrestrial radiation and first introduced the idea that such mutation may occur proportionally to the dose of radiation. Various laboratories, including Muller's, then demonstrated the apparent linear dose response of mutation frequency. Muller, who received a Nobel Prize for his work on the mutagenic effect of radiation in 1946, asserted in his Nobel lecture, The Production of Mutation, that mutation frequency is "directly and simply proportional to the dose of irradiation applied" and that there is "no threshold dose".

The early studies were based on higher levels of radiation that made it hard to establish the safety of low level of radiation. Indeed, many early scientists believed that there may be a tolerance level, and that low doses of radiation may not be harmful. A later study in 1955 on mice exposed to low dose of radiation suggests that they may outlive control animals. The interest in the effects of radiation intensified after the dropping of atomic bombs on Hiroshima and Nagasaki, and studies were conducted on the survivors. Although compelling evidence on the effect of low dosage of radiation was hard to come by, by the late 1940s, the idea of LNT became more popular due to its mathematical simplicity. In 1954, the National Council on Radiation Protection and Measurements (NCRP) introduced the concept of maximum permissible dose. In 1958, the United Nations Scientific Committee on the Effects of Atomic Radiation (UNSCEAR) assessed the LNT model and a threshold model, but noted the difficulty in acquiring "reliable information about the correlation between small doses and their effects either in individuals or in large populations". The United States Congress Joint Committee on Atomic Energy (JCAE) similarly could not establish if there is a threshold or "safe" level for exposure; nevertheless, it introduced the concept of "As Low As Reasonably Achievable" (ALARA). ALARA would become a fundamental principle in radiation protection policy that implicitly accepts the validity of LNT. In 1959, the United States Federal Radiation Council (FRC) supported the concept of the LNT extrapolation down to the low dose region in its first report.

By the 1970s, the LNT model had become accepted as the standard in radiation protection practice by a number of bodies. In 1972, the first report of National Academy of Sciences (NAS) Biological Effects of Ionizing Radiation (BEIR), an expert panel who reviewed available peer reviewed literature, supported the LNT model on pragmatic grounds, noting that while "dose-effect relationship for x rays and gamma rays may not be a linear function", the "use of linear extrapolation ... may be justified on pragmatic grounds as a basis for risk estimation." In its seventh report of 2006, NAS BEIR VII writes, "the committee concludes that the preponderance of information indicates that there will be some risk, even at low doses".

The Health Physics Society (in the United States) has published a documentary series on the origins of the LNT model.

== Radiation precautions and public policy ==
Radiation precautions have led to sunlight being listed as a carcinogen at all sun exposure rates, due to the ultraviolet component of sunlight, with no safe level of sunlight exposure being suggested, following the precautionary LNT model. According to a 2007 study submitted by the University of Ottawa to the Department of Health and Human Services in Washington, D.C., there is not enough information to determine a safe level of sun exposure.

The linear no-threshold model is used to extrapolate the expected number of extra deaths caused by exposure to environmental radiation, and it therefore has a great impact on public policy. The model is used to translate any radiation release, into a number of lives lost, while any reduction in radiation exposure, for example as a consequence of radon detection, is translated into a number of lives saved. When the doses are very low the model predicts new cancers only in a very small fraction of the population, but for a large population, the number of lives is extrapolated into hundreds or thousands.

A linear model has long been used in health physics to set maximum acceptable radiation exposures.

In 2025, Donald Trump issued an executive order that proposed implementing "determinate radiation limits" to replace the linear no-threshold model and ALARA principle. These changes were proposed to ease the licensing requirements on new nuclear power plants in the United States.

== Controversy ==
The LNT model has been contested by a number of scientists. It has been claimed that the early proponent of the model Hermann Joseph Muller intentionally ignored an early study that did not support the LNT model when he gave his 1946 Nobel Prize Lecture advocating the model.

In very high dose radiation therapy, it was known at the time that radiation can cause a physiological increase in the rate of pregnancy anomalies; however, human exposure data and animal testing suggests that the "malformation of organs appears to be a deterministic effect with a threshold dose", below which no rate increase is observed. A review in 1999 on the link between the Chernobyl accident and teratology (birth defects) concludes that "there is no substantive proof regarding radiation‐induced teratogenic effects from the Chernobyl accident". It is argued that the human body has defense mechanisms, such as DNA repair and programmed cell death, that would protect it against carcinogenesis due to low-dose exposures of carcinogens. However, these repair mechanisms are known to be error prone.

A 2011 research of the cellular repair mechanisms support the evidence against the linear no-threshold model. According to its authors, this study published in the Proceedings of the National Academy of Sciences of the United States of America "casts considerable doubt on the general assumption that risk to ionizing radiation is proportional to dose".

A 2011 review of studies addressing childhood leukaemia following exposure to ionizing radiation, including both diagnostic exposure and natural background exposure from radon, concluded that existing risk factors, excess relative risk per sievert (ERR/Sv), is "broadly applicable" to low dose or low dose-rate exposure, "although the uncertainties associated with this estimate are considerable". The study also notes that "epidemiological studies have been unable, in general, to detect the influence of natural background radiation upon the risk of childhood leukaemia"

Many expert scientific panels have been convened on the risks of ionizing radiation. Most explicitly support the LNT model and none have concluded that evidence exists for a threshold, with the exception of the French Academy of Sciences in a 2005 report. Considering the uncertainty of health effects at low doses, several organizations caution against estimating health effects below certain doses, generally below natural background, as noted below:

- The US Nuclear Regulatory Commission upheld the LNT model in 2021 as a "sound regulatory basis for minimizing the risk of unnecessary radiation exposure to both members of the public and radiation workers" following challenges to the dose limit requirements contained in its regulations.
  Based upon the current state of science, the NRC concludes that the actual level of risk associated with low doses of radiation remains uncertain and some studies, such as the INWORKS study, show there is at least some risk from low doses of radiation. Moreover, the current state of science does not provide compelling evidence of a threshold, as highlighted by the fact that no national or international authoritative scientific advisory bodies have concluded that such evidence exists. Therefore, based upon the stated positions of the aforementioned advisory bodies; the comments and recommendations of NCI, NIOSH, and the EPA; the October 28, 2015, recommendation of the ACMUI; and its own professional and technical judgment, the NRC has determined that the LNT model continues to provide a sound regulatory basis for minimizing the risk of unnecessary radiation exposure to both members of the public and occupational workers. Consequently, the NRC will retain the dose limits for occupational workers and members of the public in 10 CFR part 20 radiation protection regulations.
- In 2004 the United States National Research Council (part of the National Academy of Sciences) supported the linear no threshold model and stated regarding Radiation hormesis:
  The assumption that any stimulatory hormetic effects from low doses of ionizing radiation will have a significant health benefit to humans that exceeds potential detrimental effects from the radiation exposure is unwarranted at this time.
- In 2005 the United States National Academies' National Research Council published its comprehensive meta-analysis of low-dose radiation research BEIR VII, Phase 2. In its press release the Academies stated:
  The scientific research base shows that there is no threshold of exposure below which low levels of ionizing radiation can be demonstrated to be harmless or beneficial.
- In a 2005 report, the International Commission on Radiological Protection stated: "The report concludes that while existence of a low-dose threshold does not seem to be unlikely for radiation-related cancers of certain tissues, the evidence does not favour the existence of a universal threshold. The LNT hypothesis, combined with an uncertain DDREF for extrapolation from high doses, remains a prudent basis for radiation protection at low doses and low dose rates." In a 2007 report, ICRP noted that collective dose is effective for optimization, but aggregation of very low doses to estimate excess cancers is inappropriate because of large uncertainties.
- The National Council on Radiation Protection and Measurements (a body commissioned by the United States Congress), in a 2018 report, "concludes that the recent epidemiological studies support the continued use of LNT model (with the steepness of the dose-response slope perhaps reduced by a DDREF factor) for radiation protection. This is in accord with judgments by other national and international scientific committees, based on somewhat older data, that no alternative dose-response relationship appears more pragmatic or prudent for radiation protection purposes than the LNT model."
- The United States Environmental Protection Agency endorses the LNT model in its 2011 report on radiogenic cancer risk:
  Underlying the risk models is a large body of epidemiological and radiobiological data. In general, results from both lines of research are consistent with a linear, no-threshold dose (LNT) response model in which the risk of inducing a cancer in an irradiated tissue by low doses of radiation is proportional to the dose to that tissue
- UNSCEAR stated in Appendix C of its 2020/2021 report:
  The Committee concluded that there remains good justification for the use of a non-threshold model for risk inference given the robust knowledge on the role of mutation and chromosomal aberrations in carcinogenesis. That said, there are ways that radiation could act that might lead to a re-evaluation of the use of a linear dose-response model to infer radiation cancer risks.

A number of organisations caution against using the Linear no-threshold model to estimate risk from radiation exposure below a certain level:

- The French Academy of Sciences (Académie des sciences) and the National Academy of Medicine (Académie nationale de médecine) published a report in 2005 (at the same time as BEIR VII report in the United States) that rejected the linear no-threshold model in favor of a threshold dose response and a significantly reduced risk at low radiation exposure:
  In conclusion, this report raises doubts on the validity of using LNT for evaluating the carcinogenic risk of low doses (< 100 mSv) and even more for very low doses (< 10 mSv). The LNT concept can be a useful pragmatic tool for assessing rules in radioprotection for doses above 10 mSv; however since it is not based on biological concepts of our current knowledge, it should not be used without precaution for assessing by extrapolation the risks associated with low and even more so, with very low doses (< 10 mSv), especially for benefit-risk assessments imposed on radiologists by the European directive 97-43.
- The Health Physics Society's position statement first adopted in January 1996, last revised in February 2019, states:
  The Health Physics Society advises against estimating health risks to people from exposures to ionizing radiation that are near or less than natural background levels because statistical uncertainties at these low levels are great.
- The American Nuclear Society states that the LNT model may not adequately describe the relationship between harm and exposure and notes the recommendation in ICRP-103 "that the LNT model not be used for estimating the health effects of trivial exposures received by large populations over long periods of time..." It further recommends additional research.
- UNSCEAR stated in its 2012 report:
  The Scientific Committee does not recommend multiplying very low doses by large numbers of individuals to estimate numbers of radiation-induced health effects within a population exposed to incremental doses at levels equivalent to or lower than natural background levels.

== Mental health effects ==
It has been argued that the LNT model had caused an irrational fear of radiation, whose observable effects are much more significant than non-observable effects postulated by LNT. In the wake of the 1986 Chernobyl accident in Ukraine, Europe-wide anxieties were fomented in pregnant mothers over the perception enforced by the LNT model that their children would be born with a higher rate of mutations. As far afield as the country of Switzerland, hundreds of excess induced abortions were performed on the healthy unborn, out of this no-threshold fear. Following the accident however, studies of data sets approaching a million births in the EUROCAT database, divided into "exposed" and control groups were assessed in 1999. As no Chernobyl impacts were detected, the researchers conclude "in retrospect the widespread fear in the population about the possible effects of exposure on the unborn was not justified". Despite studies from Germany and Turkey, the only robust evidence of negative pregnancy outcomes that transpired after the accident were these elective abortion indirect effects, in Greece, Denmark, Italy etc., due to the anxieties created.

The consequences of low-level radiation are often more psychological than radiological. Because damage from very-low-level radiation cannot be detected, people exposed to it are left in anguished uncertainty about what will happen to them. Many believe they have been fundamentally contaminated for life and may refuse to have children for fear of birth defects. They may be shunned by others in their community who fear a sort of mysterious contagion.

Forced evacuation from a radiation or nuclear accident may lead to social isolation, anxiety, depression, psychosomatic medical problems, reckless behavior, or suicide. Such was the outcome of the 1986 Chernobyl nuclear disaster in Ukraine. A comprehensive 2005 study concluded that "the mental health impact of Chernobyl is the largest public health problem unleashed by the accident to date". Frank N. von Hippel, a U.S. scientist, commented on the 2011 Fukushima nuclear disaster, saying that "fear of ionizing radiation could have long-term psychological effects on a large portion of the population in the contaminated areas".

Such great psychological danger does not accompany other materials that put people at risk of cancer and other deadly illness. Visceral fear is not widely aroused by, for example, the daily emissions from coal burning, although as a National Academy of Sciences study found, this causes 10,000 premature deaths a year in the US. It is "only nuclear radiation that bears a huge psychological burden – for it carries a unique historical legacy".

== See also ==
- DNA repair
- Dose fractionation
- Nuclear power debate § Health effects on population near nuclear power plants and workers
- Radiation-induced cancer
- Radiology
- Radiotherapy
- Inge Schmitz-Feuerhake
- Biphasic Model, a fringe theory that low dose radiation is generally more harmful than higher doses.
