= Chris Busby =

Chris Busby may refer to:

- Christopher Busby, British scientist
- Chris Busby (rugby union), Irish rugby referee
