= Radiation hormesis =

Unproven hypothesis regarding low doses of ionizing radiation on health

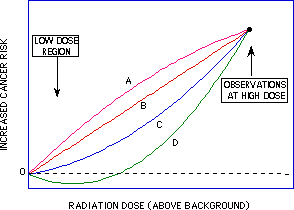
Alternative assumptions for the extrapolation of the cancer risk vs. radiation dose to low-dose levels, given a known risk at a high dose: supra-linearity (A), linear (B), linear-quadratic (C) and hormesis (D).

Radiation hormesis is the hypothesis that low doses of ionizing radiation (within the region of and just above natural background levels) are beneficial, stimulating the activation of repair mechanisms that protect against disease, that are not activated in absence of ionizing radiation. The reserve repair mechanisms are hypothesized to be sufficiently effective when stimulated as to not only cancel the detrimental effects of ionizing radiation but also inhibit disease not related to radiation exposure (see hormesis). It has been promoted by the British physicist Wade Allison in a book published in 2009.

While the effects of high and acute doses of ionising radiation are easily observed and understood in humans (e.g. Japanese atomic bomb survivors), the effects of low-level radiation are very difficult to observe and highly controversial. This is because the baseline cancer rate is already very high and the risk of developing cancer fluctuates 40% because of individual life style and environmental effects, obscuring the subtle effects of low-level radiation. An acute effective dose of 100 millisieverts may increase cancer risk by ~0.8%.

However, children are particularly sensitive to radioactivity, with childhood leukemias and other cancers increasing even within natural and man-made background radiation levels (under 4 mSv cumulative with 1 mSv being an average annual dose from terrestrial and cosmic radiation, excluding radon which primarily doses the lung). There is limited evidence that exposures around this dose level will cause negative subclinical health impacts to neural development. Multiple nationwide studies now converge on a small but statistically significant increase in childhood leukaemia and CNS tumour risk with increasing background gamma exposure of between +4% to +6% per mSv of cumulative bone-marrow dose. Results are most consistent in studies with accurate, long-term residential data, and align with predictions from the Linear No-Threshold model. Evidence for radon remains weaker and more uncertain, though new pooled European analyses suggest a possible low-dose effect that warrants confirmation.

Hormesis remains largely unknown to the public. Government and regulatory bodies disagree on the existence of radiation hormesis and research points to the "severe problems and limitations" with the use of hormesis in general as the "principal dose-response default assumption in a risk assessment process charged with ensuring public health protection."

Quoting results from a literature database research, the Académie des Sciences – Académie nationale de Médecine (French Academy of Sciences – National Academy of Medicine) stated in their 2005 report concerning the effects of low-level radiation that many laboratory studies have observed radiation hormesis. However, they cautioned that it is not yet known if radiation hormesis occurs outside the laboratory, or in humans.

Reports by the United States National Research Council and the National Council on Radiation Protection and Measurements and the United Nations Scientific Committee on the Effects of Atomic Radiation (UNSCEAR) argue that there is no evidence for hormesis in humans and in the case of the National Research Council hormesis is outright rejected as a possibility. Therefore, estimating linear no-threshold model (LNT) continues to be the model generally used by regulatory agencies for human radiation exposure.

== Proposed mechanism and ongoing debate ==
A very low dose of a chemical agent may trigger from an organism the opposite response to a very high dose.

Radiation hormesis proposes that radiation exposure comparable to and just above the natural background level of radiation is not harmful but beneficial, while accepting that much higher levels of radiation are hazardous. Proponents of radiation hormesis typically claim that radio-protective responses in cells and the immune system not only counter the harmful effects of radiation but additionally act to inhibit spontaneous cancer not related to radiation exposure. Radiation hormesis stands in stark contrast to the more generally accepted linear no-threshold model (LNT), which states that the radiation dose-risk relationship is linear across all doses, so that small doses are still damaging, albeit less so than higher ones. Opinion pieces on chemical and radiobiological hormesis appeared in the journals Nature and Science in 2003.

Assessing the risk of radiation at low doses (<100 mSv) and low dose rates (<0.1 mSv.min^{−1}) is highly problematic and controversial. While epidemiological studies on populations of people exposed to an acute dose of high level radiation such as Japanese atomic bomb survivors (hibakusha (被爆者)) have robustly upheld the LNT (mean dose ~210 mSv), studies involving low doses and low dose rates have failed to detect any increased cancer rate. This is because the baseline cancer rate is already very high (~42 of 100 people will be diagnosed in their lifetime) and it fluctuates ~40% because of lifestyle and environmental effects, obscuring the subtle effects of low level radiation. Epidemiological studies may be capable of detecting elevated cancer rates as low as 1.2 to 1.3 i.e. 20% to 30% increase. But for low doses (1–100 mSv) the predicted elevated risks are only 1.001 to 1.04 and excess cancer cases, if present, cannot be detected due to confounding factors, errors and biases.

In particular, variations in smoking prevalence or even accuracy in reporting smoking cause wide variation in excess cancer and measurement error bias. Thus, even a large study of many thousands of subjects with imperfect smoking prevalence information will fail to detect the effects of low level radiation than a smaller study that properly compensates for smoking prevalence. Given the absence of direct epidemiological evidence, there is considerable debate as to whether the dose-response relationship <100 mSv is supralinear, linear (LNT), has a threshold, is sub-linear, or whether the coefficient is negative with a sign change, i.e. a hormetic response.

The radiation adaptive response seems to be a main origin of the potential hormetic effect. The theoretical studies indicate that the adaptive response is responsible for the shape of dose-response curve and can transform the linear relationship (LNT) into the hormetic one.

While most major consensus radioprotection reports and government safety authorities currently adhere to the LNT model to better protect people and workers health against ionising radiation hazard, the 2005 French Academy of Sciences-National Academy of Medicine's report concerning the effects of low-level radiation rejected LNT as a scientific model of carcinogenic risk at low doses.

Using LNT to estimate the carcinogenic effect at doses of less than 20 mSv is not justified in the light of current radiobiologic knowledge.

They consider there to be several dose-effect relationships rather than only one, and that these relationships have many variables such as target tissue, radiation dose, dose rate and individual sensitivity factors. They request that further study is required on low doses (less than 100 mSv) and very low doses (less than 10 mSv), as well as the impact of tissue type and age. The Academy considers the LNT model to be useful for safety and regulatory purposes, as it better protects people and simplifies administrative tasks. Quoting results from literature research, they furthermore claim that approximately 40% of laboratory studies on cell cultures and animals indicate some degree of chemical or radiobiological hormesis, and state:

...its existence in the laboratory is beyond question and its mechanism of action appears well understood.

They go on to outline a growing body of research that illustrates that the human body is not a passive accumulator of radiation damage but it actively repairs the damage caused via a number of different processes, including:

- Mechanisms that mitigate reactive oxygen species generated by ionizing radiation and oxidative stress.
- Apoptosis of radiation damaged cells that may undergo tumorigenesis is initiated at only few mSv.
- Cell death during meiosis of radiation damaged cells that were unsuccessfully repaired.
- The existence of a cellular signaling system that alerts neighboring cells of cellular damage.
- The activation of enzymatic DNA repair mechanisms around 10 mSv.
- Modern DNA microarray studies which show that numerous genes are activated at radiation doses well below the level that mutagenesis is detected.
- Radiation-induced tumorigenesis may have a threshold related to damage density, as revealed by experiments that employ blocking grids to thinly distribute radiation.
- A large increase in tumours in immunosuppressed individuals illustrates that the immune system efficiently destroys aberrant cells and nascent tumors.

Furthermore, increased sensitivity to radiation induced cancer in the inherited condition Ataxia-telangiectasia like disorder, illustrates the damaging effects of loss of the repair gene Mre11h resulting in the inability to fix DNA double-strand breaks.

The BEIR-VII report argued that, "the presence of a true dose threshold demands totally error-free DNA damage response and repair." The specific damage they worry about is double strand breaks (DSBs) and they continue, "error-prone nonhomologous end joining (NHEJ) repair in postirradiation cellular response, argues strongly against a DNA repair-mediated low-dose threshold for cancer initiation". Recent research observed that DSBs caused by CAT scans are repaired within 24 hours and DSBs may be more efficiently repaired at low doses, suggesting that the risk of ionizing radiation at low doses may not be directly proportional to the dose. However, it is not known if low-dose ionizing radiation stimulates the repair of DSBs not caused by ionizing radiation i.e. a hormetic response.

Radon gas in homes is the largest source of radiation dose for most individuals and it is generally advised that the concentration be kept below 150 Bq/m^{3} (4 pCi/L). A recent retrospective case-control study of lung cancer risk showed substantial cancer rate reduction between 50 and 123 Bq per cubic meter relative to a group at zero to 25 Bq per cubic meter. This study is cited as evidence for hormesis, but a single study all by itself cannot be regarded as definitive. Other studies into the effects of domestic radon exposure have not reported a hormetic effect; including for example the respected "Iowa Radon Lung Cancer Study" of Field et al. (2000), which also used sophisticated radon exposure dosimetry. In addition, Darby et al. (2005) argue that radon exposure is negatively correlated with the tendency to smoke and environmental studies need to accurately control for this; people living in urban areas where smoking rates are higher usually have lower levels of radon exposure due to the increased prevalence of multi-story dwellings. When doing so, they found a significant increase in lung cancer amongst smokers exposed to radon at doses as low as 100 to 199 Bq m^{−3} and warned that smoking greatly increases the risk posed by radon exposure i.e. reducing the prevalence of smoking would decrease deaths caused by radon. However, the discussion about the opposite experimental results is still going on, especially the popular U.S. and German studies have found some hormetic effects.

Furthermore, particle microbeam studies show that passage of even a single alpha particle (e.g. from radon and its progeny) through cell nuclei is highly mutagenic, and that alpha radiation may have a higher mutagenic effect at low doses (even if a small fraction of cells are hit by alpha particles) than predicted by linear no-threshold model, a phenomenon attributed to bystander effect. However, there is currently insufficient evidence at hand to suggest that the bystander effect promotes carcinogenesis in humans at low doses.

== Statements by leading nuclear bodies ==
Radiation hormesis has not been accepted by either the United States National Research Council, or the National Council on Radiation Protection and Measurements (NCRP). In May 2018, the NCRP published the report of an interdisciplinary group of radiation experts who critically reviewed 29 high-quality epidemiologic studies of populations exposed to radiation in the low dose and low dose-rate range, mostly published within the last 10 years. The group of experts concluded:

The recent epidemiologic studies support the continued use of the LNT model for radiation protection. This is in accord with judgments by other national and international scientific committees, based on somewhat older data, that no alternative dose-response relationship appears more pragmatic or prudent for radiation protection purposes than the LNT model.

In addition, the United Nations Scientific Committee on the Effects of Atomic Radiation (UNSCEAR) wrote in its 2000 report:

Until the [...] uncertainties on low-dose response are resolved, the Committee believes that an increase in the risk of tumour induction proportionate to the radiation dose is consistent with developing knowledge and that it remains, accordingly, the most scientifically defensible approximation of low-dose response. However, a strictly linear dose response should not be expected in all circumstances.

This is a reference to the fact that very low doses of radiation have only marginal impacts on individual health outcomes. It is therefore difficult to detect the 'signal' of decreased or increased morbidity and mortality due to low-level radiation exposure in the 'noise' of other effects. The notion of radiation hormesis has been rejected by the National Research Council's (part of the National Academy of Sciences) 16-year-long study on the Biological Effects of Ionizing Radiation. "The scientific research base shows that there is no threshold of exposure below which low levels of ionizing radiation can be demonstrated to be harmless or beneficial. The health risks – particularly the development of solid cancers in organs – rise proportionally with exposure" says Richard R. Monson, associate dean for professional education and professor of epidemiology, Harvard School of Public Health, Boston.

The possibility that low doses of radiation may have beneficial effects (a phenomenon often referred to as "hormesis") has been the subject of considerable debate. Evidence for hormetic effects was reviewed, with emphasis on material published since the 1990 BEIR V study on the health effects of exposure to low levels of ionizing radiation. Although examples of apparent stimulatory or protective effects can be found in cellular and animal biology, the preponderance of available experimental information does not support the contention that low levels of ionizing radiation have a beneficial effect. The mechanism of any such possible effect remains obscure. At this time, the assumption that any stimulatory hormetic effects from low doses of ionizing radiation will have a significant health benefit to humans that exceeds potential detrimental effects from radiation exposure at the same dose is unwarranted.

== Studies of low-level radiation ==
=== Cancer rates and very high natural background gamma radiation at Kerala, India ===
The monazite sand in the Indian state of Kerala (which contains a third of the world's economically recoverable reserves of radioactive thorium) emits about 8 microsieverts per hour of gamma radiation, 80 times the dose rate equivalent in London, but a decade-long study of 69,985 residents published in Health Physics in 2009 "showed no excess cancer risk from exposure to terrestrial gamma radiation. The excess relative risk of cancer excluding leukemia was estimated to be −0.13 per Gy (95% CI: −0.58, 0.46)", indicating no statistically significant positive or negative relationship between background radiation levels and cancer risk in this sample.

=== Cultures ===
Studies in cell cultures can be useful for finding mechanisms for biological processes, but they also can be criticized for not effectively capturing the whole of the living organism.

A study by E. I. Azzam suggested that pre-exposure to radiation causes cells to turn on protection mechanisms. A different study by de Toledo and collaborators has shown that irradiation with gamma rays increases the concentration of glutathione, an antioxidant found in cells.

In 2011, an in vitro study led by S. V. Costes showed in time-lapse images a strongly non-linear response of certain cellular repair mechanisms called radiation-induced foci (RIF). The study found that low doses of radiation prompted higher rates of RIF formation than high doses, and that after low-dose exposure RIF continued to form after the radiation had ended. Measured rates of RIF formation were 15 RIF/Gy at 2 Gy, and 64 RIF/Gy at 0.1 Gy. These results suggest that low dose levels of ionizing radiation may not increase cancer risk directly proportional to dose and thus contradict the linear-no-threshold standard model. Mina Bissell, a world-renowned breast-cancer researcher and collaborator in this study stated: "Our data show that at lower doses of ionizing radiation, DNA repair mechanisms work much better than at higher doses. This non-linear DNA damage response casts doubt on the general assumption that any amount of ionizing radiation is harmful and additive."

=== Animals ===
An early study on mice exposed to low dose of radiation daily (0.11 R per day) suggest that they may outlive control animals. A study by Otsuka and collaborators found hormesis in animals. Miyachi conducted a study on mice and found that a 200 mGy X-ray dose protects mice against both further X-ray exposure and ozone gas. In another rodent study, Sakai and collaborators found that (1 mGy/h) gamma irradiation prevents the development of cancer (induced by chemical means, injection of methylcholanthrene).

In a 2006 paper, a dose of 1 Gy was delivered to the cells (at constant rate from a radioactive source) over a series of lengths of time. These were between 8.77 and 87.7 hours, the abstract states for a dose delivered over 35 hours or more (low dose rate) no transformation of the cells occurred. Also for the 1 Gy dose delivered over 8.77 to 18.3 hours that the biological effect (neoplastic transformation) was about "1.5 times less than that measured at high dose rate in previous studies with a similar quality of [X-ray] radiation". Likewise it has been reported that fractionation of gamma irradiation reduces the likelihood of a neoplastic transformation. Pre-exposure to fast neutrons and gamma rays from Cs-137 is reported to increase the ability of a second dose to induce a neoplastic transformation.

Caution must be used in interpreting these results, as it noted in the BEIR VII report, these pre-doses can also increase cancer risk:

In chronic low-dose experiments with dogs (75 mGy/d for the duration of life), vital hematopoietic progenitors showed increased radioresistance along with renewed proliferative capacity (Seed and Kaspar 1992). Under the same conditions, a subset of animals showed an increased repair capacity as judged by the unscheduled DNA synthesis assay (Seed and Meyers 1993). Although one might interpret these observations as an adaptive effect at the cellular level, the exposed animal population experienced a high incidence of myeloid leukemia and related myeloproliferative disorders. The authors concluded that "the acquisition of radioresistance and associated repair functions under the strong selective and mutagenic pressure of chronic radiation is tied temporally and causally to leukemogenic transformation by the radiation exposure" (Seed and Kaspar 1992).

However, 75 mGy/d cannot be accurately described as a low dose rate – it is equivalent to over 27 sieverts per year. The same study on dogs showed no increase in cancer nor reduction in life expectancy for dogs irradiated at 3 mGy/d.

=== Humans ===
==== Effects of slightly increased radiation level ====
In long-term study of Chernobyl disaster liquidators was found that: "During current research paradoxically longer telomeres were found among persons, who have received heavier long-term irradiation." and "Mortality due to oncologic diseases was lower than in general population in all age groups that may reflect efficient health care of this group." Though in conclusion interim results were ignored and conclusion followed LNT hypothesis: "The signs of premature aging were found in Chernobyl disaster clean-up workers; moreover, aging process developed in heavier form and at younger age in humans, who underwent greater exposure to ionizing radiation."

A study of survivors of the Hiroshima atomic bomb explosion yielded similar results.

==== Effects of sunlight exposure ====
In an Australian study which analyzed the association between solar UV exposure and DNA damage, the results indicated that although the frequency of cells with chromosome breakage increased with increasing sun exposure, the misrepair of DNA strand breaks decreased as sun exposure was heightened.

==== Effects of cobalt-60 exposure ====
The health of the inhabitants of radioactive apartment buildings in Taiwan has received prominent attention. In 1982, more than 20,000 tons of steel was accidentally contaminated with cobalt-60, and much of this radioactive steel was used to build apartments, exposing thousands of Taiwanese to gamma-radiation levels up to over 1,000 times background (average 47.7 mSv; maximum 2,360 mSv excess cumulative dose). The radioactive contamination was discovered in 1992. In the years shortly after exposure, the total number of cancer cases was reported to be either lower than the society-wide average or slightly elevated.

A 2004 paper by Chen et al. claimed that residents of Taiwanese buildings constructed with cobalt-60-contaminated steel had lower cancer mortality than the general population and interpreted this as possible evidence of a radiation hormesis effect. However, the study was widely criticized for methodological flaws, including comparing a predominantly young exposed cohort with the much older general population of Taiwan and failing to adjust for age and other confounders. The later, peer-reviewed study by Hwang et al. (2006), based on a complete registry of 7,271 residents and age- and sex-adjusted incidence analyses, found instead that prolonged low-dose-rate gamma exposure in the cobalt-60-contaminated apartments increased the risk of certain cancers – particularly leukemia, lymphoma, thyroid, and breast cancers – among those first exposed before age 30. Hwang et al. (2006) additionally cautioned that, based on the experience of the Hiroshima and Nagasaki bombings, it could be decades before an increase in other cancer types is observed.

Besides the excess risks of leukemia, lymphoma, thyroid, and breast cancer, later publications noted elevated DNA anomalies and other health effects among the exposed population:

There have been several reports concerning the radiation effects on the exposed population, including cytogenetic analyses showing increased micronucleus frequencies in peripheral lymphocytes, increases in acentromeric and centromeric chromosomal damage, and higher frequencies of chromosomal translocations, rings, and dicentrics. Other analyses have reported persistent depression of peripheral leucocytes and neutrophils, increased eosinophils, altered distributions of lymphocyte subpopulations, increased frequencies of lens opacities, delayed physical development among exposed children, increased risk of thyroid abnormalities, and late consequences in haematopoietic adaptation in children.

Subsequent peer-reviewed studies have continued to follow the Taiwanese population exposed to cobalt-60-contaminated buildings. A 30-year follow-up (1983–2012) of 6,242 individuals found dose-dependent increases in the incidence of leukemia (excluding chronic lymphocytic leukemia), breast cancer, and all cancers combined, with the strongest effects among those first exposed before age 20, a similar pattern previously reported by Hwang et al. (2008). Additional studies have examined non-cancer outcomes: residents exposed during childhood showed higher frequencies of lens opacities (radiation-induced cataracts) and reduced fecundability (longer time-to-pregnancy) associated with higher dose rates. Together, these investigations indicate that prolonged low-dose-rate gamma exposure can increase certain cancer risks and produce measurable non-cancer biological effects, particularly in individuals exposed early in life.

==== Radon therapy ====
Intentional exposure to water and air containing increased amounts of radon is perceived as therapeutic, and "radon spas" can be found in United States, Czechia, Poland, Germany, Austria and other countries.

== Effects of no radiation ==
Given the uncertain effects of low-level and very-low-level radiation, there is a pressing need for quality research in this area. An expert panel convened at the 2006 Ultra-Low-Level Radiation Effects Summit at Carlsbad, New Mexico, proposed the construction of an Ultra-Low-Level Radiation laboratory. The proposed laboratory would investigate the effects of almost no radiation on laboratory animals and cell cultures, and compare these groups to control groups exposed to natural radiation levels. Precautions would be made, for example, to remove potassium-40 from the food of laboratory animals. The expert panel concluded that the Ultra-Low-Level Radiation Laboratory could uniquely explore with authority and confidence the effects of low-level radiation, and potentially confirm or discard competing radiobiological models such as the LNT, threshold, and radiation hormesis hypotheses.

Since the 2006 Carlsbad summit, several deep-underground and ultra-low-background radiation biology experiments have been established to investigate whether shielding organisms from natural ionising radiation produces measurable biological effects. One of the main research sites, the Low Background Radiation Experiment (LBRE) at the U.S. Waste Isolation Pilot Plant in New Mexico, provides a radiation environment roughly 70–80 times lower than surface levels and has been used to culture bacteria, protozoa, and mammalian cells under near-zero radiation conditions. Studies at WIPP and in European underground laboratories such as the Laboratori Nazionali del Gran Sasso (LNGS) in Italy have shown that microorganisms and cell lines shielded from natural background radiation can exhibit changes in growth rate, gene expression, and stress responses compared to controls kept at surface levels. A 2022 review of reduced-background studies concluded that, while measurable physiological and genetic changes occur in simple organisms and cultured cells, there is still no consistent evidence for either harmful or beneficial health effects in mammals or humans exposed to very-low-level or sub-background radiation. Recent experimental platforms at LNGS have refined dosimetry and environmental control to allow long-term mammalian cell-exposure studies, but the biological mechanisms and implications for radiation protection policy remain under active investigation.

== See also ==
- Background radiation
- Dose fractionation
- Hormesis
- Linear no-threshold model
- Petkau effect
- Radioresistance
- Radithor
- Ramsar, Iran
