= Committee on Medical Aspects of Radiation in the Environment =

UK-wide advisory committee

The Committee on Medical Aspects of Radiation in the Environment (COMARE) is a UK-wide advisory committee set up by the British government. It was established in 1985.

== Terms of reference and function ==
The terms of reference of COMARE are:

"to assess and advise Government and the devolved authorities on the health effects of natural and man-made radiation and to assess the adequacy of the available data and the need for further research".

COMARE is an independent expert advisory committee with members chosen for their medical and scientific expertise and recruited from universities, research and medical institutes. Members have never been drawn from the nuclear or electrical power supply industries.

The committee offers independent advice to all government departments and devolved authorities, not just the health departments, and is responsible for assessing and advising them on the health effects of natural and man-made radiation. It is also asked to assess the adequacy of the available data and advise on the need for further research.

COMARE had produced fourteen reports on a wide range of radiation issues by 2011.

The COMARE secretariat is provided by Public Health England which has incorporated the former Health Protection Agency's Radiation Protection Division, formerly the National Radiological Protection Board.

== CERRIE ==
The Department of Health and the Department for Environment, Food and Rural Affairs asked COMARE to review the risks from internal radiation emitters and advise on any further research required. To help them to do this they set up the Committee Examining Radiation Risks from Internal Emitters (CERRIE) which operated between October 2001 and October 2004.

The following persons were on the panel

Chairman

Professor Dudley Goodhead, MRC Radiation and Genome Stability Unit

Members

- Mr Richard Bramhall, The Low Level Radiation Campaign
- Dr Chris Busby, Green Audit
- Dr Roger Cox, National Radiological Protection Board
- Dr Philip Day, University of Manchester
- Professor Sarah Darby, ICRF Cancer Epidemiology Unit, University of Oxford
- Dr John Harrison, National Radiological Protection Board
- Dr Colin Muirhead, National Radiological Protection Board
- Mr Pete Roche, Greenpeace UK
- Professor Jack Simmons, University of Westminster
- Dr Richard Wakefield, British Nuclear Fuels Ltd
- Professor Eric Wright, Ninewells Medical School, Dundee.

== See also ==
- Centre for Radiation, Chemical and Environmental Hazards (CRCE) in Oxfordshire
- Committed dose
- Public Health England
