= Christopher Busby =

British scientist

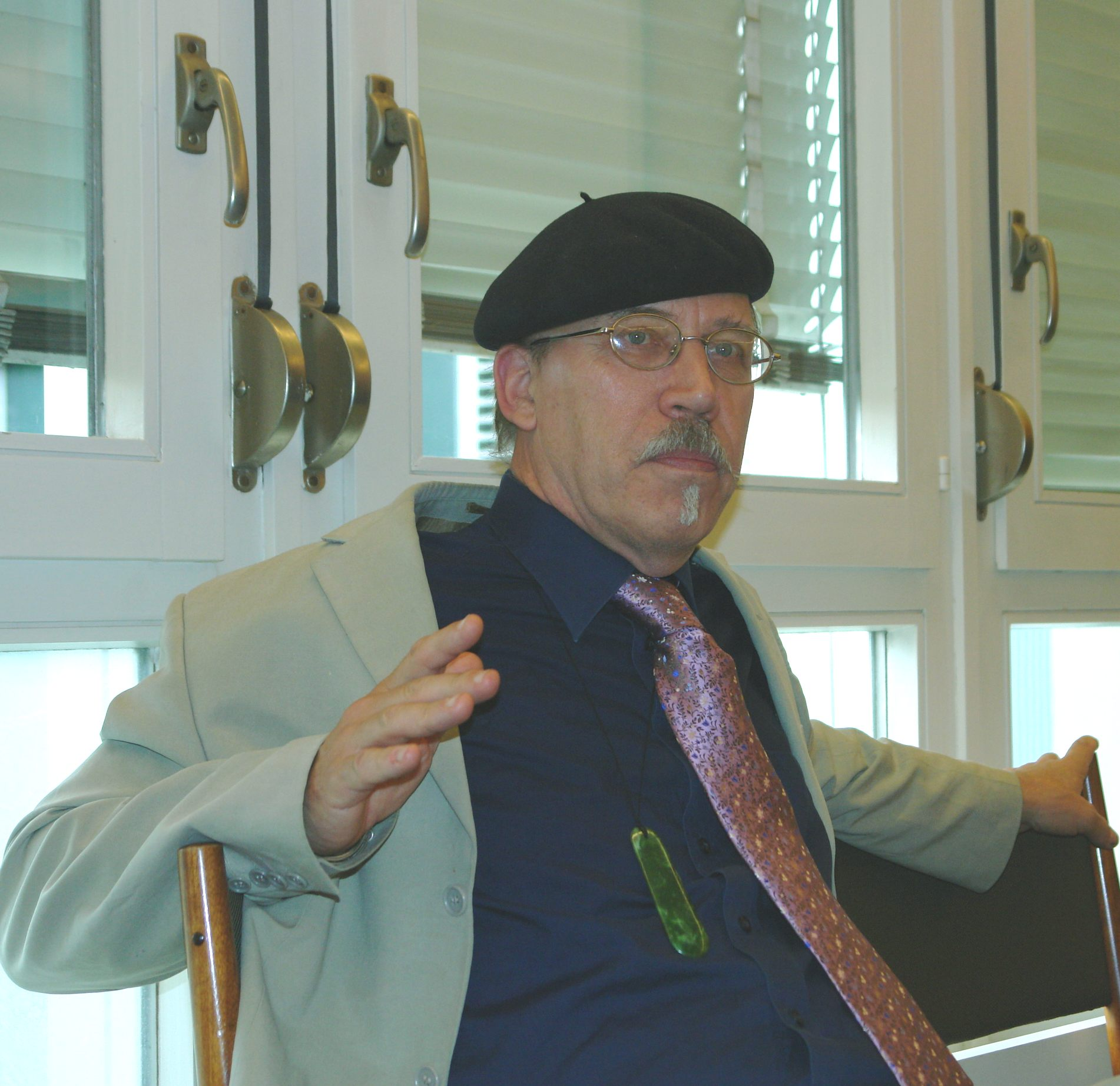
Busby in 2007

Christopher Busby (born 1 September 1945) is a British scientist primarily studying the health effects of internal ionising radiation. Busby was a director of Green Audit Limited, a now dissolved private company which published a number of his books and papers, and scientific advisor to the Low Level Radiation Campaign (LLRC).

Following the 2011 Fukushima Daiichi nuclear disaster, Busby established a television and internet presence where he discussed the risks of ionizing radiation and the Japanese Government's handling of the disaster. A Japanese language website marketed tests and a mineral supplement (dubbed an "anti-radiation" pill, and condemned by leading scientists as "useless") that Busby advised could mitigate the effects of ingested radioisotopes.

== Career ==
Busby obtained a BSc in Chemistry with First Class Honours from the University of London. He later gained a PhD in chemical physics at the University of Kent, researching Raman spectro-electrochemistry. Busby was a member of the British government sponsored Committee Examining Radiation Risks from Internal Emitters (CERRIE), which operated from 2001 to 2004. In 2001, he was appointed to the UK Ministry of Defence Oversight Committee on Depleted Uranium (DUOB). Between 2003 and 2007 he was a Fellow of the Faculty of Medicine, University of Liverpool, in the Department of Human Anatomy and Cell Biology, and he was visiting professor at the School of Biomedical Sciences until his retirement in 2012 University of Ulster. From 2007 to 2008 he was Guest Researcher at The Institute for Plant Nutrition and Soil Science of the Federal Agricultural Research Station in Braunschweig, Germany (FAL; from 2008 on JKI) and Jacobs University Bremen for a year and is currently Scientific Director of the private company Environmental Research SIA in Riga, Latvia. Busby is a former National Speaker on Science and Technology for the Green Party of England and Wales.

== Second event theory and photoelectric effect controversy ==
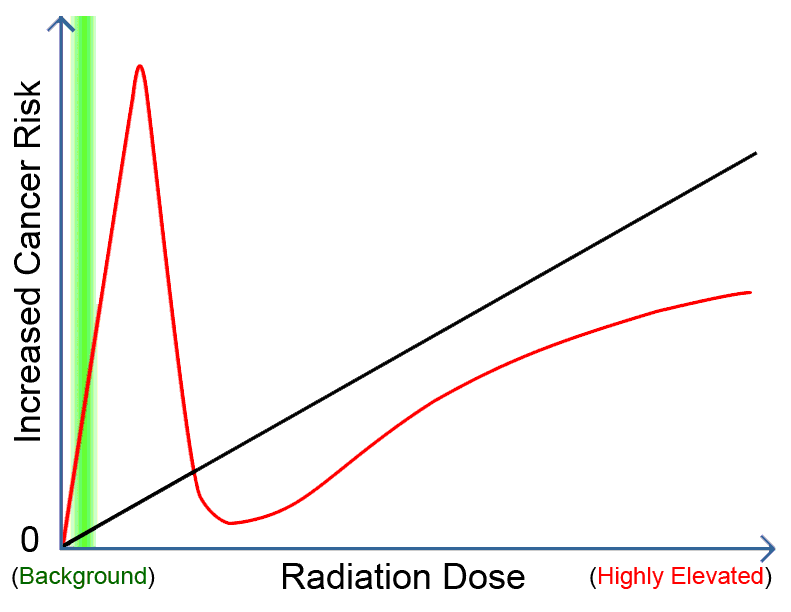
The Biphasic Curve: The cancer risk vs. radiation level in the low-dose regime (0 to 200 mSv) for LNT and the 'Biphasic Curve' promoted by Busby. Background radiation is ~2.4 mSv/year (diagram adapted by Busby from Burlakova et al. (1998)).

From 1987 onwards Busby has written on the health effects of ionizing radiation and developed what he has named "second event theory" (SET) and "photoelectric effect theory" (PET). He claims that these theories demonstrate that the widely accepted linear no-threshold (LNT) model substantially underestimates the risk of low level radiation (the LNT model is largely constructed from the 1958 to 2001 'Life Span Study' of the 120,321 Japanese Atomic Bomb Survivors (hibakusha (被爆者)) who were exposed to a powerful external burst of neutron and gamma radiation). Busby claims that in the low dose regime, radiation moderately above background causes more cancer than much higher levels of radiation i.e. a biphasic (bimodal) curve; a claim based on the work of Russian biologist Elena Burlakova.

Busby initially proposed the Second Event Theory in 1995, in his self-published book Wings of Death: Nuclear Pollution and Human Health claiming that isotopes which decay sequentially, emitting two or more particles in a short decay chain, have far greater genotoxic effects than predicted by the LNT model. According to this theory, the ^{90}Sr-^{90}Y decay chain would be ~30 times more carcinogenic than predicted by LNT. According to SET, primary exposure to a beta particle alters a cell to the G_{2} Phase, which Busby claims would render the cell highly radio-sensitive and more prone to malignant changes when exposed to a second particle.

SET was criticised by Cox & Edwards (2000) who stated that if Busby's "biologically implausible" theory was correct and all irradiated cells undergo transformation to the G_{2} Phase, it would cause an increased risk factor of just 1.3 times and predict, on the contrary, substantial risk reduction at low doses for single emitting radioisotopes. Furthermore, it was established in 1906 (The Law of Bergonié and Tribondeau) that cells in the G_{2} Phase are more resistant to radiation than cells in the M Phase (Radiosensitivity and Cell cycle). The Committee Examining Radiation Risks of Internal Emitters (CERRIE) report, on which Busby was one of twelve members, exhaustively examined the biological plausibility of SET and commissioned an independent consultant to conduct a literature review. In 2004 CERRIE rejected the SET by a 10 to 2 majority consensus (Busby and non-scientist Richard Bramhall, dissented). The rejection was made for following reasons:

- The lack of biological plausibility for the basic preconditions of the SET
- The paucity of supporting evidence in the proponents' reviews of the SET
- The weakness of studies cited in support of the SET
- The absence of supporting evidence found by the independent review commissioned by the Committee

CERRIE also considered and rejected by 10 to 2 consensus the biphasic (bimodal) curve of Burlakova et al. (1999), due to the study's "substantial shortcomings"; tables were so ambiguous that the risk-dose response could be interpreted as linear, biphasic or even promoting health (radiation hormesis).

In 2011, Busby began selling a minority report for £25 on his website, in which he claimed that cancer risk from internal exposures to low doses of radiation is 300 times greater than predicted under the LNT model, that the LNT model is meaningless, and that cancer incidence rates in Sweden and Belarus increased by 40% since Chernobyl. His opinion on the magnitude of the cancer risk related to internal exposure to radionuclides is not consistent with the findings of analyses of lung cancer and internal exposure to alpha particles in nuclear workers.

Later work by Busby focused on the health effects of ingested depleted uranium particles and the photoelectric effect theory (PET). The photoelectric effect theory proposes that ingested uranium particles vastly increase the potency of natural background radiation, by 500 to 1000 times, via the photoelectric effect. However, subsequent computer simulations by Pattison (2013) indicate that radiation enhancement via the photoelectric effect is minute, the radiation enhancement effect due to one 10 μm-sized DU particle in 1 cm^{3} of tissue is just 2 in 10 million greater than a particle not being present.

== Conflicts with other low-dose radiation researchers ==
Busby is the author of two self-published books on cancer incidence in Wales, Wings of Death and Wolves of Water.

The books were criticised in the Journal of Radiological Protection as "erroneous in consequence of various mistakes". According to Richard Wakeford, the editor-in-chief of the journal, a fellow CERRIE committee member representing the nuclear industry, and a specialist in the health effects of low-dose radiation (formerly with British Nuclear Fuels), Busby's work is "Deeply flawed".

Busby served on the UK Government's Committee Examining Radiation Risks of Internal Emitters (CERRIE), which operated between 2001 and 2004, and included medical professionals, scientists, delegates from Greenpeace and Friends of the Earth, and Richard Wakeford representing the nuclear industry. Busby ultimately disagreed with the committee's conclusions and published a "minority report" with another committee member from LLRC. On the LLRC website page selling the minority report, it's claimed (without citation) that north Sweden cancer rates have increased by 40% since Chernobyl. A doctoral dissertation from 2007 was reported as saying that the area "has shown a small but statistically significant increase in the incidence of cancer".

Antone Brooks (former Technical Research Director of the US Department of Energy's Low Dose Radiation Research Program) has also had differences with Busby.

== Televised comments on Fukushima I nuclear accidents ==
Fukushima's Harsh Warning, Chris Busby's interview

In a 14 March broadcast on BBC, Busby was interviewed along with Ian Fells, and characterised the accident as "exactly the same scenario" as Chernobyl. While admitting that the containment structure for Fukushima Dai-ichi was more advanced than that at Chernobyl, he claimed there could be "nuclear explosion" rather than (as reported) a hydrogen explosion, if fuel elements had melted down and collected at the bottom of the vessel. He also asserted that radiation levels measured at a reactor north of Fukushima Dai-ichi (i.e. Onagawa) indicated that "up to 100 kilometers away, we are getting concentrations of plutonium, cesium and iodine" (sic – presumably radionuclides thereof) released from Fukushima Dai-ichi, making the releases comparable in his opinion to Chernobyl, in terms of human health impact. In response to Fells' characterisation of the worst immediate effects being loss of power to an advanced industrial society, Busby said "this is a radiological catastrophe already", asserting in particular that plutonium releases were a major cause of concern.

On 30 March 2011, Busby first appeared on RT (formerly known as Russia Today) stating that the Fukushima Nuclear Disaster was worse than being reported. During the follow-up interview on 13 April 2011, Busby stated that Fukushima radiation pollution could cause up to 400,000 added cancer cases among those living within 200 km of the reactor, with " reports of significant radiation ... even south of Tokyo".

=== Controversy regarding sale of "Anti-radiation" pills ===
Following the Fukushima Daiichi nuclear disaster, Busby established an internet presence discussing the risks of ionizing radiation and a conspiracy theory involving Japanese Government's efforts to spread radioactive contamination throughout the country. He also marketed online, services and a mineral supplement he claimed mitigate the dangers of ingested radioisotopes.

Busby claimed radioactive caesium-137 released from the nuclear disaster can cause heart muscle damage and heart attacks in children and a mineral supplement, sold on his Japanese language website via 4u-detox of San Pedro, California, could prevent these deleterious effects (labelled Busby Laboratories, Formula 1, Christopher Busby Foundation for The Children of Fukushima). Busby says he bases his cardiac claims on the work of husband-and-wife team Yury Bandazhevsky and Galina Bandazhevskaya; known for their controversial claims that arrhythmia and heart attacks occurred in children at caesium-137 levels as low as 50 Bqkg^{−1} and that oral apple pectin increases its excretion (by comparison banana contains ca. 3000 Bqkg^{−1} of natural potassium-40).

Busby later self-published a document that he claimed offered theoretical support for his supplement, namely an ability to block certain radioisotopes from binding to DNA. However, his document also explains that his supplement cannot block caesium-137, because it does not contain a protective dose of stable caesium:

Unfortunately, the laws prohibit the sale of such tablets despite the fact that Caesium is totally non-toxic at these levels.

Note that even if the pills contained stable cesium it is unlikely that the stable cesium would increase the rate at which radioactive cesium is lost from a person. It has been shown by Prochazka et al. that the addition of stable cesium to the diet of pigs fails to increase the rate at which radioactive cesium is lost from the pigs

Additionally, Busby alleges the Japanese Government is involved in a conspiracy to spread radioactive contamination throughout Japan, in an effort to hide cancer clusters from epidemiologists and thus hinder litigation (cancer clusters are typically statistically identified by comparison with an unexposed cohort). Gerry Thomas, professor of molecular pathology at the department of surgery and cancer at Imperial College, London, condemned the "anti-radiation" pills as useless and described the claims made by Busby as ludicrous. Ohtsura Niwa, professor at the Kyoto University Radiation Biology Center and CEO of BioMedics Japan, disagreed with Busby's contention that radiation is being deliberately spread throughout Japan. Niwa noted that the ownership of dosimeters in Japan is now widespread and if radioactive contamination was actively spread about, people would know. Niwa also agreed with Thomas, that mineral supplements cannot guard against strontium, uranium and plutonium radioisotopes. Similar mineral supplements are widely available in chemists in Tokyo, at 1/8th cost offered by Busby Laboratories.

In 2008, a research team at the Experimental Radio-TOXological Laboratory (LRTOX), France, independently investigated the effects of high level (500 Bqkg^{−1}) caesium-137 exposure in animals (heart, testes, blood, cholesterol, immune system, foetus etc.). For example, Guéguen et al. (2008) investigated the possible cardiac effects of 500 Bqkg^{−1} caesium-137 exposure in rats over 3 months. They observed that, while caesium-137 exposure did not cause any damage to heart cells or arrhythmias, results indicated that quite subtle cardiac impairment might worsen in some sensitive individuals over time. Also, Le Gal et al. (2006) found that the excretion of caesium-137 was not increased by oral apple pectin, however prussian blue (the drug Radiogardase) enhanced faecal excretion of caesium-137 fivefold. Furthermore, the study of Bandazhevskaya (2004) involving oral apple pectin was criticised by Jargin (2010), who highlighted a number of serious flaws that meant the claims made could not substantiated.

Claiming that a supplement can be of use in the "cure, mitigation, treatment, or prevention of disease" renders it equivalent to a drug and subject to oversight by the US Food and Drug Administration (FDA) (Section 201(g)(1) of the 1938 Federal Food, Drug, and Cosmetic Act). Specifically, drugs must be demonstrated to work and proven safe. In April 2011, the FDA sent warning letters to an unrelated company, Premier Micronutrient Corporation of Nashville, Tennessee, US, who similarly claim that its "anti-oxidant" supplements are capable of preventing illness caused by radiation (Bioshield-Radiation R1 and Bioshield Radiation R2). The FDA pointed out there was no scientific data demonstrating the drugs safety or effectiveness in treating radiation exposure. However, Bioshield Radiation R2 subsequently resumed sale with a legal waver, "These statements have not been evaluated by the Food and Drug Administration. This product is not intended to diagnose, treat, cure, or prevent any disease."; that it is a food supplement. The FDA approves three over-the-counter drugs for iodine-131 and one prescription drug (Radiogardase) for caesium-137 contamination.

== Research on weapons derived uranium ==
Busby has written and spoken about the potential health effects of depleted uranium. He has claimed that people have been exposed to uranium during the 2nd Gulf War (2003), the Bosnia campaign (1996), and in the 2006 Israel-Lebanon war. However, a study by the United Nations Environment Programme did not find any traces of depleted uranium in weapons used during the 2006 Israel-Lebanon war.

A review of past studies of birth defects in Iraq concluded that there was no clear increase in birth defects and no clear indication of a possible environmental exposure including depleted uranium.

In November 2012, Busby gave a talk in Geneva at the Human Rights Council about the failures of radiation protection as a human rights issue.

== Arrest under the Explosives Substances Act (1883) ==
He was arrested in 2018 in Devon after the nerve agent attack on the Skripals when some police officers visited his home after reports that his 29-year-old housemate was acting in a strange manner. He was not arrested in connection with the nerve agent attack but after two police officers felt unwell in his house. He was arrested under the Explosive Substances Act 1883 before being released later. Chris Busby did state that he had a bottle of nitric acid somewhere in the house. Chris Busby expressed the view that his arrest and the search of his home were a retaliation against him for his work on nuclear matters. The possession of nitric acid is regulated by the Control of Poisons and Explosives Precursors Regulations 2015 when the concentration of the nitric acid is above 3%. An aqueous solution which is 3% nitric acid is circa 0.7 M.

== Relocation to Latvia ==
Chris Busby has relocated to Latvia and the author information on his paper on the epidemiology of cancer risks associated with service aboard a nuclear powered ship (USS Ronald Reagan) indicates his address to be Riga. His paper argues that there is a higher rate of cancer in the workers on the ship than there are in other US Navy Personnel.

In recent times Chris Busby has published a paper on the origins of life where he considers entropy and Maxwell's demon, he argues that the phosphate mineral apaitite was involved in the creation of the first life forms.

== Selected publications ==
- Busby, Christopher (2016). "Letter to the Editor on "The Hiroshima Nagasaki survivor studies. Discrepancies between results and general perception." By Bernard R Jordan". Genetics. 204 (2): 1627–1629. doi:10.1534/genetics.116.195339. PMC 5161290. PMID 27927905.
- Schmitz-Feuerhake I, Busby C, Pflugbeil S (2016). "Genetic Radiation Risks-A Neglected Topic in the Low Dose Debate". Environmental Health and Toxicology. 31 e2016001. doi:10.5620/eht.e2016001. PMC 4870760. PMID 26791091.
- Alaani, Samira; Tafash, Muhammed; Busby, Christopher; Hamdan, Malak; Blaurock-Busch, Eleonore (2011). "Uranium and other contaminants in hair from the parents of children with congenital anomalies in Fallujah". Conflict and Health. 5 (15): 1–15. doi:10.1186/1752-1505-5-15. PMC 3177876. PMID 21888647.
- Busby Chris; Hamdan Malak; Ariabi Entesar (2010). "Cancer, Infant Mortality and Birth Sex-Ratio in Fallujah, Iraq 2005–2009". Int. J. Environ. Res. Public Health. 7 (7): 2828–2837. doi:10.3390/ijerph7072828. PMC 2922729. PMID 20717542.
- Busby CC (2009). "Very low dose fetal exposure to Chernobyl contamination resulted in increases in infant leukemia in Europe and raises questions about current radiation risk models". International Journal of Environmental Research and Public Health. 6 (12): 3105–3114. doi:10.3390/ijerph6123105. PMC 2800337. PMID 20049249.
- Busby, Chris; Lengfelder, Edmund; Pflugbeil, Sebastian; Schmitz-Feuerhake, Inge (2009). "The evidence of radiation effects in embryos and fetuses exposed by Chernobyl fallout and the question of dose response". Medicine, Conflict and Survival. 25 (1): 18–39. doi:10.1080/13623690802568954. PMID 19413155. S2CID 24387735.
- Busby Chris and Schnug Ewald (2008). "Advanced biochemical and biophysical aspects of uranium contamination". In: (Eds) De Kok, L.J. and Schnug, E. Loads and Fate of Fertilizer Derived Uranium. Backhuys Publishers, Leiden, The Netherlands, ISBN 978-90-5782-193-6.
- Koppe JG, Bartonova A, Bolte G, Bistrup ML, Busby C, Butter M, et al. (2006). "Exposure to multiple environmental agents and their effects". Acta Paediatrica Supplement. 453 (453): 106–114. doi:10.1080/08035320600886646. PMID 17000577. S2CID 43142072.
- Van den Hazel P, Zuurbier M, Babisch W, Bartonova A, Bistrup M-L Bolte G, Busby C, et al. (2006). "Today's epidemics in children: possible relations to environmental pollution". Acta Paediatrica Supplement. 453: 18–26.
- Busby C, Fucic A (2006). "Ionizing Radiation and children's health: PINCHE conclusions". Acta Paediatrica Supplement. 453 (453): 81–86. doi:10.1080/08035320600886547. PMID 17000574. S2CID 43645857.
- Busby CC, Scott Cato M (2001). "Increases in leukemia in infants in Wales and Scotland following Chernobyl: Evidence for errors in statutory risk estimates and dose response assumptions". International Journal of Radiation Medicine. 3 (1): 23.
- Busby CC, Scott Cato M (1997). "Death Rates from Leukemia are Higher than Expected in Areas around Nuclear Sites in Berkshire and Oxfordshire". British Medical Journal. 315 (7103): 309. doi:10.1136/bmj.315.7103.309. PMC 2127200. PMID 9274556.

== Books ==
- Busby, CC (1992). Low level radiation from the nuclear industry: the biological consequences. (Aberystwyth: Green Audit) ISBN 1-897761-00-7.
- Busby, CC (1994). Radiation and Cancer in Wales (Aberystwyth: Green Audit). ISBN 1-897761-02-3.
- Busby, CC (1995). Wings of Death: Nuclear Pollution and Human Health (Aberystwyth: Green Audit) ISBN 1-897761-03-1.
- Edited by Busby CC, Bertell R, Yablokov A, Schmitz-Feuerhake I, and Scott Cato M (2003). ECRR2003: 2003 recommendations of the European Committee on Radiation Risk: The health effects of ionizing radiation at low dose — Regulator's edition. (Brussels: ECRR-2003). ISBN 1-897761-24-4.
- Scott Cato M with Busby CC and Bramhall R (2000). I don't know Much about Science: political decision making in scientific and technical areas. Aberystwyth: Green Audit. ISBN 1-897761-21-X.
- Bramhall R with Busby CC and Dorfman P (2004). CERRIE Minority Report 2004: Minority Report of the UK Department of Health/ Department of Environment (DEFRA) Committee Examining Radiation Risk from Internal Emitters (CERRIE). Aberystwyth: Sosiumi Press. ISBN 0-9543081-1-5.
- Busby CC and others (2004) Report of the Committee Examining Radiation Risk from Internal Emitters (CERRIE) Chilton, UK: National Radiological Protection Board. ISBN 0-85951-545-1.
- Busby C and Yablokov AV (2006) ECRR 2006. Chernobyl 20-year On. The Health Effects of the Chernobyl Accident. Brussels: ECRR/ Aberystwyth: Green Audit. ISBN 1-897761-15-5.
- Busby C (2006) Wolves of Water. A Study Constructed from Atomic Radiation, Morality, Epidemiology, Science, Bias, Philosophy and Death. Aberystwyth: Green Audit ISBN 1-897761-26-0
- Busby C (2009) Our Mother who art in Everything: Poems 2004-8. Llandrinddod Wells, Wales: Sosiumi Press. ISBN 0-9543081-5-8.
- Busby, C (ed.) &al. (2011). Fukushima and Health: What to Expect: Proceedings of the 3rd International Conference of the European Committee on Radiation Risk, Lesvos Greece 5/6 May 2009 (Documents of the ECRR) Green Audit. ISBN 978-1897761175.
- Also: Busby C (2004) Nuclear Cover-Ups Video DVD Aberystwyth: Green Audit Films Busby Christo (2009) Songs from a Cold Climate (CD) Aberystwyth: Green Audit.
- Busby, C (2015) What is life? : on the origin and mechanism of living systems.

ISBN 9780956513212

== Book chapters ==
- Busby, C. C. (1996a), ' in Bramhall, R. (ed.), The Health Effects of Low Level Radiation: Proceedings of a Symposium held at the House of Commons, 24 April 1996 (Aberystwyth: Green Audit).
- Busby, C. C. (1998), 'Enhanced mutagenicity from internal sequentially decaying beta emitters from second event effects.' In 'Die Wirkung niedriger Strahlendosen- im kindes-und Jugendalter, in der Medizin, Umwelt ind technik, am Arbeitsplatz'. Proceedings of International Congress of the German Society for Radiation Protection. Eds: Koehnlein W and Nussbaum R. Muenster, 28 March 1998 (Bremen: Gesellschaft fur Strahlenschutz)
- Busby C.C and Scott Cato M (1999) 'A Planetary Impact index' in Molly Scott Cato and Miriam Kennett eds. Green Economics – beyond supply and demand to meeting peoples needs. Aberystwyth: Green Audit
- Busby C (2004) Depleted Science: the health consequences and mechanisms of exposure to fallout from Depleted Uranium weapons. In The Trojan Horses of Nuclear War Kuepker M and Kraft D eds. Hamburg: GAAA
- Busby Chris (2007) New nuclear risk models, real health effects and court cases. pp 35–46 in- Updating International Nuclear Law Eds—Stockinger H, van Dyke JM et al. Vienna: Neuer Wissenschaftlicher Verlag
- Busby C (2008) Depleted Uranium. Why all the fuss? United Nations Disarmament Forum Journal UNIDIR, Nov 2008

== See also ==
- Radiation hormesis
- Arnold Gundersen
