= European Committee on Radiation Risk =

The European Committee on Radiation Risk (ECRR) is an informal committee formed in 1997 following a meeting by the European Green Party at the European Parliament to review the Council of Europe's directive 96/29Euratom, issued in May of the previous year. ECRR is not a formal scientific advisory committee to the European Commission or to the European Parliament. Its report is published by the Green Audit. Dr. Busby is the secretary of ECRR.

== First meeting ==
The Council of Europe directive was a wide-ranging ruling regarding the use and transport of natural and artificial radioactive materials within the European Union, but the inaugural ECRR meeting concentrated on the proposal of Article 4.1.c: "...radioactive substances in the production and manufacture of consumer goods...".

The EU legislators had found it convenient to incorporate the findings of the International Commission on Radiological Protection (ICRP) model for assessing radiation risk from internal emitters, but the ECRR challenged this and suggested that the model underestimates the risks by at least a factor of 10 "while..studies relating to certain types of exposure..suggest that the error is even greater". The ECRR have proposed a method of re-weighting the risk factors to take into account the biophysical properties of the particular isotopes involved.

== Publications ==
- ECRR 2003: Recommendations of the European Committee on Radiation Risk: Health Effects of Ionising Radiation Exposure at Low Doses for Radiation Protection Purposes. Regulators' Edition Green Audit. ISBN 978-1897761243. Also available in French, ISBN 978-2876714496.
- ECRR 2006: Chernobyl 20 Years On: the Health Effects of the Chernobyl Accident Green Audit. ISBN 978-1897761250; 2nd ed. 2009, ISBN 978-1897761151. Also available in Spanish.
- ECRR 2010: The Health Effects of Exposure to Low Doses of Ionizing Radiation: Regulators’ Edition Green Audit. ISBN 978-1-897761-16-8, online
- 2011: Fukushima and Health: What to Expect: Proceedings of the 3rd International Conference of the European Committee on Radiation Risk, Lesvos Greece May 5/6th 2009 (Documents of the ECRR) Green Audit. ISBN 978-1897761175.

== Responses ==
Chernobyl 20 Years On is cited in a letter by Professor Rudi H. Nussbaum from Portland State University published in Environmental Health Perspectives which challenges the accepted view of the long-term health consequences from the incident.

Shortly after the 2003 Recommendations was published the United Kingdom's Health Protection Agency issued a response, in which they describe the ECRR as "...a self-styled organisation with no formal links to official bodies" and criticize its findings as "arbitrary and [without] a sound scientific basis. Furthermore, there are many misrepresentations of [the] ICRP".

== Membership ==
Alice Stewart was the first Chair of the ECRR. The Chair of the Scientific Committee is Professor Inge Schmitz-Feuerhake. Christopher Busby is Scientific Secretary.
