= Co-operative studies =

Co-operative study is a broad subject that refers to study in relation to co-operatives, a type of legal entity. This should not be confused a type of education called co-operative education.

The International Cooperative Alliance (ICA)'s Statement on the Co-operative Identity identifies Education, Training and Information as one of the 7 Co-operative Principles. Education was a part of the original Rochdale Principles and has remained through multiple revisions.

Co-operative study can be divided into two categories:

1. The study OF co-operatives. This refers to the academic discipline of co-operatives, including research about co-operatives. Subfields of this include Co-operative economics, and the History of the cooperative movement.
2. Education WITHIN co-operatives . This refers to transferring knowledge, skills and abilities for those involved with co-operatives using formal, non-formal and informal measures. Examples include on-the-job training, professional development and knowledge sharing.

== ICA Principle 5 - Education, Training and Information ==
Education is central to co-operative enterprises. It has been a foundational principle since the co-operative movement was formed with the Rochdale Pioneers, with current success of the co-operative movement today being credited to early co-operators being willing to share and learn.

‘Education’ refers to sharing the Co-operative Principles and Values: what they are, how to apply them, and encouraging engagement with co-operative thought for social impact and development. ‘Training’ refers to developing members and employees with practical skills needed to run the co-operative enterprise. ‘Information’ refers to promoting the co-operative movement and its benefits with the public.

The scope of co-operative education is vast. Audiences include members, elected representatives, managers and employees, and the public. Formal and informal learning opportunities are used to share knowledge on a wide variety of values aligned topics such as governance and democracy. Education for young people and opinion leaders is important because they play a key role in advancing the co-operative movement. Education must be accessible to all co-operative members with a specific focus on underrepresented groups.

The ICA identifies the need to strengthen and expand co-operative education in all levels of educational institutions, including more academic research and supporting emerging economies.

In December 2011 a special edition of the Journal of Co-operative Studies was given over to the subject of co-operative learning. Edited by Maureen Breeze, the edition contains 14 articles written by theorists and practitioners of co-operative learning. Contributors include Alan Wilkins (Co-operative Learning: a contextual framework), Nigel Rayment (Co-operative Learning: values into practice), Wendy Jolliffe (Co-operative learning: making it work in the classroom) and Nick Matthews (Teaching About Co-operatives in a UK University Business School).

== The Study of Co-operatives ==
The co-operative business model has unique legal structure and features that support values-based, people-centered approach to business. The study of co-operatives supports the development and sharing of knowledge. Areas for importance include co-operative heritage and continued academic research, co-operative education in national curriculum including specialization within higher education, supporting co-operative education in emerging economies, continuous learning and open availability, educating the public about the co-operative enterprise difference and impact and information technologies and data.

Some examples of where and how co-operatives are being studied include:

- International Centre for Co‑operative Management at Saint Mary’s University in Halifax, Nova Scotia, Canada offers co-operative education and research on co-operative management and governance through degree, certificate, short courses and publications.
- The Association of Co-operative Educators (ACE) has a repository of free co-operative education resources including learning paths for onboarding, leadership and governance and co-operative development.
- Co-operative organizations and federations offer resources and courses, often free or at low cost. Some examples of resources and courses include The Canadian Worker Co-operative Federation (CWCF/FCCT), Cooperative Housing Foundation (CHF), Cooperatives Europe and National Co-operative Business Association CLUSA International (NCBA CLUSA).

== Education within Co-operatives ==
Education within co-operatives is based on the needs of the enterprise, including general operations, development and self-help. Areas for importance include innovation, technology, equity and advancing the co-operative movement in connection with the ICA principles.

Some examples of education within co-operatives include:

- Every black co-operative in the United States of America started with a study group. Examples of education that stemmed from organizing include the promotion of the co-operative movement as a viable option to improve the life of African Americans, resources to share the value and impact of co-operatives, understanding the co-operative model, economy and industry information and on-the-job training.
- Conducting and sharing research to support innovation for digital transformation. For example, the Nebraska Cooperative Council (NCC) created a digital co-operative culture for emerging technologies, including standards and a training program to support agricultural leaders.

== See also ==
- Cooperative education
