= Inge Schmitz-Feuerhake =

German scientist

Inge Schmitz-Feuerhake (born in Osnabrück, Germany on 28 September 1935) is a German physicist and mathematician. Her research has assessed the biological effects of ionizing radiation at low dosage levels. From 1973 and until her retirement in 2000 she was a professor in experimental physics at the University of Bremen. Much of her research concerned the areas of radiation contamination and the effect of low level radiation exposure, as well as the diagnostic use of nuclear radiation.

== Career ==
Her work made a major contribution to the development of biological dosimetry methods in which changes to the chromosomes in white blood cells are measured with extreme precision, by making it possible to count the concerned white blood cells under the microscope.

She wrote of her scientific findings in comprehensible language, so that they can be understood by colleagues from related disciplines and interested laypeople.

Recently, she put forward arguments against the use of mammography as breast cancer screening. Her analysis showed that precisely those women who inherited a higher risk of developing breast cancer were put at undue risk due to the radiation absorbed during the screening. Her work was praised by the medical associations of several German states.

Schmitz-Feuerhake became known in Germany for examining the rise of the number of children suffering leukemia in the surroundings of the Krümmel Nuclear Power Plant. In 1980 she examined dust in the attics of private houses in Elbmarsch and found an amount of plutonium that was not explainable by the Chernobyl disaster nor by nuclear weapons testing in the 1960s. According to her, she could prove that the found plutonium and nuclear fission products had their origin in the nuclear reactor of Krümmel. She became known as “the most well-known and likely most relentless anti-nuclear activist” against the cancer cluster Elbmarsch.

In 2003 Schmitz-Feuerhake received the Nuclear-Free Future Award for her lifetime achievement. She is also chairman of the European Committee on Radiation Risk, a group of scientists opposing nuclear power; she was elected chairman in 2003.

Schmitze-Feuerhake is vice president of Gesellschaft für Strahlenschutz e.V. (German Society for Radiation Protection).

== Selected publications ==
- Richardson DB, Wing S, Schroeder J, Schmitz-Feuerhake I, Hoffmann W (January 2005). "Ionizing radiation and chronic lymphocytic leukemia". Environmental Health Perspectives. 113 (1): 1–5. Bibcode:2005EnvHP.113....1R. doi:10.1289/ehp.7433. PMC 1253701. PMID 15626639.
- Schmitz-Feuerhake I, Mietelski JW, Gaca P (May 2003). "Transuranic isotopes and 90Sr in attic dust in the vicinity of two nuclear establishments in northern Germany". Health Physics. 84 (5): 599–607. doi:10.1097/00004032-200305000-00005. PMID 12747479. S2CID 95636524.
- Kuni H, Schmitz-Feuerhake I, Dieckmann H (July 2003). "Mammographiescreening - Vernachlässigte Aspekte der Strahlenrisikobewertung" [Mammography screening--neglected aspects of radiation risks]. Gesundheitswesen (in German). 65 (7): 443–6. doi:10.1055/s-2003-40807. PMID 12891476.
- Schmitz-Feuerhake I, von Boetticher H, Dannheim B, et al. (2002). "Estimation of x ray overexposure in a childhood leukaemia cluster by means of chromosome aberration analysis". Radiation Protection Dosimetry. 98 (3): 291–7. doi:10.1093/oxfordjournals.rpd.a006721. PMID 12018746.
- Brüske-Hohlfeld I, Scherb H, Bauchinger M, et al. (January 2001). "A cluster of childhood leukaemias near two neighbouring nuclear installations in Northern Germany: prevalence of chromosomal aberrations in peripheral blood lymphocytes". International Journal of Radiation Biology. 77 (1): 111–6. doi:10.1080/095530001453177. PMID 11213343. S2CID 25519650.

== See also ==
- Anti-nuclear movement in Germany
- John Gofman
- Ruth Faden
- Kristin Shrader-Frechette
