= UK Society for Co-operative Studies =

Society for researching co-operatives

- Formation: 3 April 1967; 57 years ago
- Legal status: Charitable incorporated organisation (CIO)
- Headquarters: Holyoake House, Manchester, England
- Main organ: Journal of Co-operative Studies
- Website: ukscs.coop

The UK Society for Co-operative Studies is a learned society and registered charity in the United Kingdom for the research of co-operatives and the co-operative movement. The society hosts conferences, lectures, and publishes the Journal of Co-operative Studies.

The society was founded in April 1967 at Stanford Hall in Nottinghamshire, England, then home to the Co-operative College. In 1995 the society became a registered charity, and in 2017 incorporated as a charitable incorporated organisation.

== Journal of Co-operative Studies ==
The Journal of Co-operative Studies is a peer-reviewed academic journal published three times a year by the society, with collaboration from the Canadian Association of Studies in Co-operation (CASC) and the Society for Co-operative Studies in Ireland. First published in 1967 as the Society for Co-operative Studies Bulletin, it adopted its current name in 1985.
