= National Council on Radiation Protection and Measurements =

Organization

The National Council on Radiation Protection and Measurements (NCRP), formerly the National Committee on Radiation Protection and Measurements, and before that the Advisory Committee on X-Ray and Radium Protection (ACXRP), is a U.S. organization. It has a congressional charter under Title 36 of the United States Code, but this does not imply any sort of oversight by Congress; NCRP is not a government entity.

== History ==
The Advisory Committee on X-Ray and Radium Protection was established in 1929. Initially, the organization was an informal collective of scientists seeking to proffer accurate information and appropriate recommendations for radiation protection. In 1946, the organization changed its name to the National Committee on Radiation Protection and Measurements.

In 1964, the U.S. Congress reorganized and chartered the organization as the National Council on Radiation Protection and Measurements.

== NCRP Presidents ==
- Lauriston S. Taylor (1929 to 1977);
- William K. Sinclair (1977 to 1991);
- Charles B. Meinhold (1991 to 2002);
- Thomas S. Tenforde (2002 to 2012);
- John D. Boice, Jr. (2012 to 2019);
- Kathryn D. Held (2019 to 2024);
- Kathryn A. Higley (2024 to present)

== Executive Directors ==
- W. Roger Ney (1964 to 1997);
- William M. Beckner (1997 to 2004);
- David A. Schauer (2004 to 2012);
- James R. Cassata (2012 to 2014);
- David A. Smith (2014 to 2016);
- Kathryn D. Held (2016 to 2019)
