= Robert Owens =

Robert Owens may refer to:

- Robert Bowie Owens (1870–1940), American electric engineer who discovered alpha rays
- Robert A. Owens (1920–1942), United States Marine Corps Medal of Honor recipient
  - USS Robert A. Owens, a Gearing-class destroyer of the United States Navy
- Robert Owens (musician) (born 1961), vocalist on Chicago house records in the 1980s
- Robert Owens (composer) (1925–2017), African-American composer, pianist, and actor
- Robert Owens (politician) (1946–2022), American politician and businessman
- Robert G. Owens Jr. (1917–2007), United States Marine general
- Bob Owens (businessman) (1921–1999), New Zealand businessman and mayor
- Bob Owens (American football, born 1935) (c. 1935–2013), American football coach
- Bob Owens (American football, born 1946), American football coach

== See also ==
- Robert Owen (disambiguation)
