= Radon storm =

A radon storm is a day-long episode of increased atmospheric radon concentration due to moving air masses. In Antarctica and over the Southern Ocean, they often occur due to the arrival of continental air from South America and Africa and the concept was coined to describe sudden radon concentration increases there. Naturally, radon increases in concentration threefold in antarctic air in the summer months of December and January.
