= Robert Owen (disambiguation) =

Robert Owen (1771–1858) was a Welsh social philosopher and reformer; one of the founders of socialism and the cooperative movement.

Robert or Rob Owen may also refer to:

- Robert Owen (Australian politician) (1799–1878), politician and judge from New South Wales, Australia
- Robert Dale Owen (1801–1877), Welsh-Scottish-American social reformer and U. S. Representative from Indiana
- Robert Owen (theologian) (1820–1902), Welsh theologian and antiquarian
- Robert L. Owen (1856–1947), American politician; represented Oklahoma in U. S. Senate
- Robert Owen (artist) (born 1937), Australian artist
- Sir Robert Owen (judge) (born 1944), British judge
- Bobby Owen (born 1947), English footballer
- Robert Owen (canoeist) (born c. 1955), British slalom canoer
- Rob Owen (journalist) (born 1971), American newspaperman
- Robert Owen (darts player) (born 1984), Welsh darts player
- Robert L. Owen Sr. (1825–1873), surveyor and civil engineer, railroad executive, politician and Virginia plantation owner

== Fictional ==
- Rob Owen (Hollyoaks), a character on the British soap opera Hollyoaks

== See also ==
- Robert Owens (disambiguation)
