= Robert Whytlaw-Gray =

English chemist (1877–1958)

- Born: 14 June 1877; Hampstead, England
- Died: 29 January 1958 (aged 80); Welwyn Garden City, England
- Education: University of Glasgow
- Awards: Fellow of the Royal Society
- Scientific career
- Workplaces: University College London; University of Bonn; University of Leeds

Robert H. Whytlaw-Gray, OBE, FRS (14 June 1877 – 29 January 1958) was an English chemist, born in London. He studied at the University of Glasgow and University College London and was professor of inorganic chemistry at the University of Leeds. He and William Ramsay isolated radon and studied its physical properties (density, weight).

== Early life and education ==
Robert Whytlaw-Gray (also Robert Whytlaw Whytlaw-Gray) was born in Hampstead on 14 June 1877, son of Robert James Gray and Mary Gilkieson Gemmell Whytlaw.

His early education was at St Paul’s School, where little science was taught. When he was about 12, Whytlaw-Gray set up a laboratory at home and taught himself chemistry. At eighteen he went to the University of Glasgow to study engineering and it was there that he heard a lecture by William Ramsay which so inspired him that he determined to go to University College London (UCL), to study under him. This he did, from 1896, so successfully that he won the Tufnell Scholarship in chemistry in 1898. The prize is awarded to "the best graduate, under the age of 24, progressing to the Research School" which presumably means Whytlaw-Gray gained a first degree, although there is no formal record of this. In 1903 he joined Anschütz’s lab at the University of Bonn, where he worked on the atomic weight of nitrogen and where he was awarded a PhD in 1906.

== Academic career ==
On his return to UCL Whytlaw-Gray was appointed to Ramsay’s staff, and made Assistant Professor in 1908. He worked on the physical properties of radon, resigning his post in 1914.

The following year he started as a temporary science master at Eton. Later Whytlaw-Gray was appointed a civilian chemical adviser to the Chemical Warfare Committee. He started work on aerosols and toxic smokes, assisted by J B Speakman. These researches were of great practical value in the war effort, and continued for many years.

In 1923 he was appointed professor of inorganic chemistry and head of the chemistry department at the University of Leeds in succession to Arthur Smithells. He stayed at Leeds for 22 years. The University conferred on him the title of Emeritus Professor on his retirement and, in 1950, the degree of DSc honoris causa.

== Honours ==
Whytlaw-Gray was awarded the OBE in 1920. He was elected a Fellow of the Royal Society (FRS) in 1928.

== Personal life ==
Whytlaw-Gray married Doris Fortescue Carr at St Stephen Walbrook on 22 July 1911. They had two daughters, Philippa Mary (born 1915) and Alianore Doris (born 1916).

== Death ==
Whytlaw-Gray died on 21 January 1958, aged 80 at The Cottage Hospital, Welwyn Garden City. His wife died in 1961.
