= Radon =

Radon, _{86}Rn
- A tube of radon gas, glowing due to a phosphorescent zinc sulfide background behind it.

Radon
- Pronunciation: /ˈreɪdɒn/ (RAY-don)
- Appearance: colorless gas
- Mass number: [222]

Radon in the periodic table
Hydrogen																															Helium
Lithium	Beryllium																									Boron	Carbon	Nitrogen	Oxygen	Fluorine	Neon
Sodium	Magnesium																									Aluminium	Silicon	Phosphorus	Sulfur	Chlorine	Argon
Potassium	Calcium															Scandium	Titanium	Vanadium	Chromium	Manganese	Iron	Cobalt	Nickel	Copper	Zinc	Gallium	Germanium	Arsenic	Selenium	Bromine	Krypton
Rubidium	Strontium															Yttrium	Zirconium	Niobium	Molybdenum	Technetium	Ruthenium	Rhodium	Palladium	Silver	Cadmium	Indium	Tin	Antimony	Tellurium	Iodine	Xenon
Caesium	Barium	Lanthanum	Cerium	Praseodymium	Neodymium	Promethium	Samarium	Europium	Gadolinium	Terbium	Dysprosium	Holmium	Erbium	Thulium	Ytterbium	Lutetium	Hafnium	Tantalum	Tungsten	Rhenium	Osmium	Iridium	Platinum	Gold	Mercury (element)	Thallium	Lead	Bismuth	Polonium	Astatine	Radon
Francium	Radium	Actinium	Thorium	Protactinium	Uranium	Neptunium	Plutonium	Americium	Curium	Berkelium	Californium	Einsteinium	Fermium	Mendelevium	Nobelium	Lawrencium	Rutherfordium	Dubnium	Seaborgium	Bohrium	Hassium	Meitnerium	Darmstadtium	Roentgenium	Copernicium	Nihonium	Flerovium	Moscovium	Livermorium	Tennessine	Oganesson
Xe
↑
Rn
↓
Og
astatine ← radon → francium
- Atomic number (Z): 86
- Group: group 18 (noble gases)
- Period: period 6
- Block: p-block
- Electron configuration: [Xe] 4f^{14} 5d^{10} 6s^{2} 6p^{6}
- Electrons per shell: 2, 8, 18, 32, 18, 8

Physical properties
- Phase at STP: gas
- Melting point: 202 K (−71 °C, −96 °F)
- Boiling point: 211.5 K (−61.7 °C, −79.1 °F)
- Density (at STP): 9.73 g/L
- when liquid (at b.p.): 4.4 g/cm^{3}
- Critical point: 377 K, 6.28 MPa
- Heat of fusion: 3.247 kJ/mol
- Heat of vaporization: 18.10 kJ/mol
- Molar heat capacity: 5R/2 = 20.786 J/(mol·K)
Vapor pressure
P (Pa)	1	10	100	1 k	10 k	100 k
at T (K)	110	121	134	152	176	211

Atomic properties
- Oxidation states: common: (none) +2, +6
- Electronegativity: Pauling scale: 2.2
- Ionization energies: 1st: 1037 kJ/mol
- Covalent radius: 150 pm
- Van der Waals radius: 220 pm
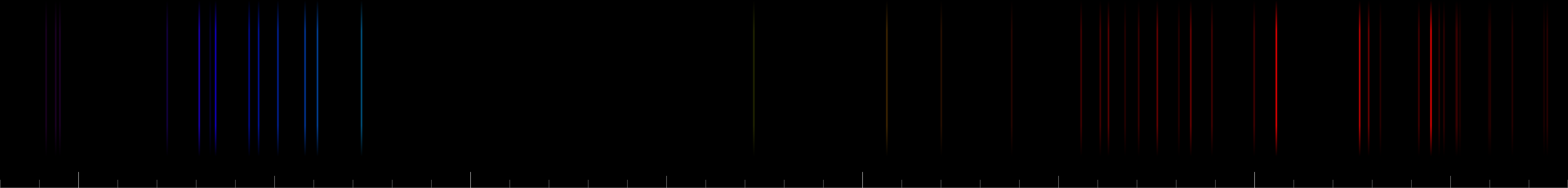
- Spectral lines of radon

Other properties
- Natural occurrence: from decay
- Crystal structure: face-centered cubic (fcc) (predicted)
- Thermal conductivity: 3.61×10^{−3} W/(m⋅K)
- Magnetic ordering: non-magnetic
- CAS Number: 10043-92-2

History
- Naming: shortened from "radium emanation", since it is released as radium decays
- Discovery: Ernest Rutherford and Robert B. Owens (1899)
- First isolation: William Ramsay and Robert Whytlaw-Gray (1910)

Isotopes of radon
Main isotopes			Decay	
Isotope	abundance	half-life (t_{1/2})	mode	product
^{210}Rn	synth	2.4 h	α96%	^{206}Po
^{210}Rn	synth	2.4 h	β^{+}4%	^{210}At
^{211}Rn	synth	14.6 h	β^{+}72.6%	^{211}At
^{211}Rn	synth	14.6 h	α27.4%	^{207}Po
^{219}Rn	trace	3.96 s	α	^{215}Po
^{220}Rn	trace	55.6 s	α	^{216}Po
^{222}Rn	trace	3.8215 d	α	^{218}Po

Radon is a chemical element; it has symbol Rn and atomic number 86. It is a radioactive noble gas and is colorless and odorless. Of the three naturally occurring radon isotopes, only ^{222}Rn has a sufficiently long half-life (3.825 days) for it to be released from the soil and rock where it is generated. Radon isotopes are the immediate decay products of radium isotopes.

The instability of ^{222}Rn, its most stable isotope, makes radon one of the rarest elements. Radon will be present on Earth for several billion more years despite its short half-life, because it is constantly being produced as a step in the decay chains of ^{238}U and ^{232}Th, both of which are abundant radioactive nuclides with half-lives of at least several billion years. The decay of radon produces many other short-lived nuclides, known as "radon daughters", ending at stable isotopes of lead. ^{222}Rn occurs in significant quantities as a step in the normal radioactive decay chain of ^{238}U, also known as the uranium series, which slowly decays into a variety of radioactive nuclides and eventually decays into stable ^{206}Pb. ^{220}Rn occurs in minute quantities as an intermediate step in the decay chain of ^{232}Th, also known as the thorium series, which eventually decays into stable ^{208}Pb.

Radon was discovered in 1899 by Ernest Rutherford and Robert B. Owens at McGill University in Montreal, and was the fifth radioactive element to be discovered. First known as "emanation", the radioactive gas was identified during experiments with radium, thorium oxide, and actinium by Friedrich Ernst Dorn, Rutherford and Owens, and André-Louis Debierne, respectively, and each element's emanation was considered to be a separate substance: radon, thoron, and actinon. Sir William Ramsay and Robert Whytlaw-Gray considered that the radioactive emanations may contain a new element of the noble gas family, and isolated "radium emanation" in 1909 to determine its properties. In 1911, the element Ramsay and Whytlaw-Gray isolated was accepted by the International Commission for Atomic Weights, and in 1923, the International Committee for Chemical Elements and the International Union of Pure and Applied Chemistry (IUPAC) chose radon as the accepted name for the element's most stable isotope, ^{222}Rn; thoron and actinon were also recognized by IUPAC as distinct isotopes of the element.

A common source of environmental radon is uranium-containing minerals in the ground. Radon can also occur in ground water, such as spring waters and hot springs. Radon trapped in permafrost may be released by climate-change-induced thawing of permafrosts, and radon may also be released into groundwater and the atmosphere following seismic events leading to earthquakes, which has led to its investigation in the field of earthquake prediction. It is possible to test for radon in buildings, and to use techniques such as sub-slab depressurization for mitigation.

Epidemiological studies have shown a clear association between breathing high concentrations of radon and incidence of lung cancer. Radon is a contaminant that affects indoor air quality worldwide. Because radon is denser than air, it accumulates in basements and crawlspaces under dwellings. According to the United States Environmental Protection Agency (EPA), radon is the second most frequent cause of lung cancer, after cigarette smoking, causing 21,000 lung cancer deaths per year in the United States. About 2,900 of these deaths occur among people who have never smoked. While radon is the second most frequent cause of lung cancer, it is the number one cause among non-smokers, according to EPA policy-oriented estimates. Significant uncertainties exist for the health effects of low-dose exposures. Due to local differences in geology, the level of exposure to radon gas differs by location.

== Characteristics ==
=== Physical properties ===
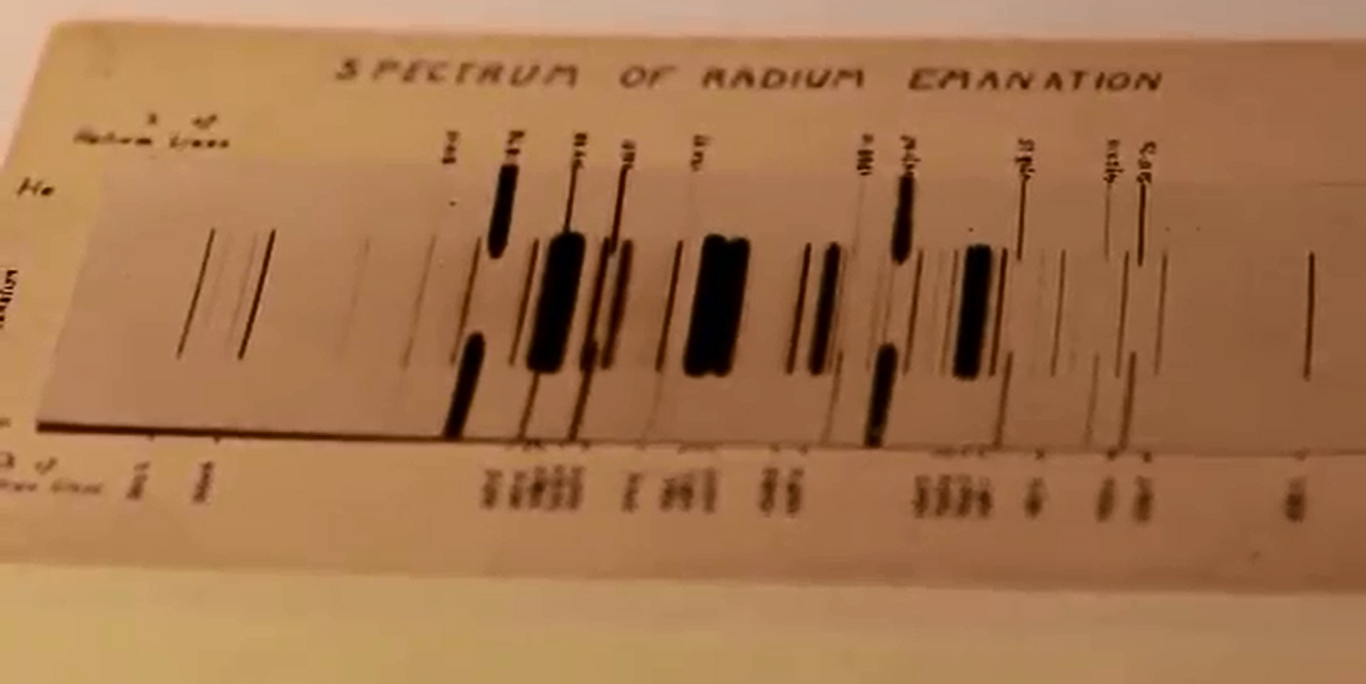
Emission spectrum of radon-222 (radium emanation), photographed by Ernest Rutherford in 1908. Numbers at the side of the spectrum are wavelengths. The middle spectrum is of radon-222, while the outer two are of helium (added to calibrate the wavelengths).

Radon is a colorless, odorless, and tasteless gas and therefore is not detectable by human senses alone. At standard temperature and pressure, it forms a monatomic gas with a density of 9.73 kg/m^{3}, about 8 times the density of the Earth's atmosphere at sea level, 1.217 kg/m^{3}. It is one of the densest gases at room temperature (a few are denser, e.g. CF_{3}(CF_{2})_{2}CF_{3} and WF_{6}) and is the densest of the noble gases. Radon is colorless at standard temperature and pressure. When cooled below its boiling point of 211.5 K (−61.6 °C; −79.0 °F), concentrated liquid radon emits radioluminescence of varying color; solidified radon emits a blue to yellow to red light when cooled further beyond its freezing point of 202 K (−71 °C; −96 °F). Due to the hazards associated with high concentrations of radon, liquid and solid radon is almost never seen. Measurements of the solubility of ^{222}Rn are unusual in that they take advantage of radon's radioactivity to compare the amount in gas and in solution.

=== Chemical properties ===
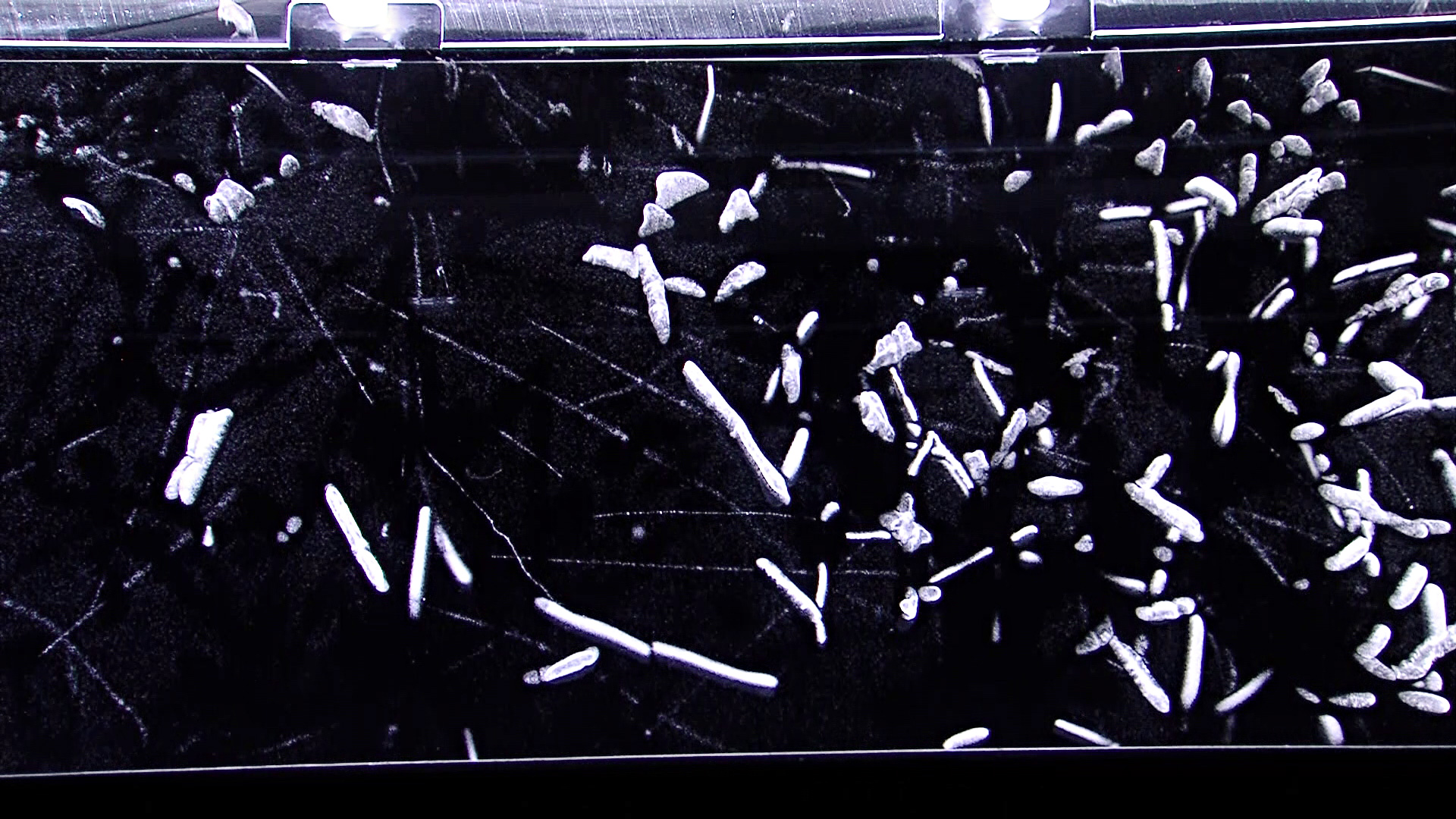
Radon in a cloud chamber. The ionizing radiation of radon causes condensation to appear as cloud tracks in the chamber.

Radon is a member of the zero-valence elements that are called noble gases, and is chemically not very reactive. The inert pair effect stabilizes the 6s shell, making it unavailable for bonding—a consequence only understood within relativistic quantum chemistry. The 3.8-day half-life of ^{222}Rn makes it useful in physical sciences as a natural tracer. Because radon is a gas at standard conditions, unlike its decay-chain parents, it can readily be extracted from them for research.

It is inert to most common chemical reactions, such as combustion, because the outer valence shell contains eight electrons. This produces a stable, minimum energy configuration in which the outer electrons are tightly bound. Its first ionization energy—the minimum energy required to extract one electron from it—is 1037 kJ/mol. In accordance with periodic trends, radon has a lower electronegativity than the element one period before it, xenon, and is therefore more reactive. Early studies concluded that the stability of radon hydrate should be of the same order as that of the hydrates of chlorine (Cl_{2}) or sulfur dioxide (SO_{2}), and significantly higher than the stability of the hydrate of hydrogen sulfide (H_{2}S).

Because of its cost and radioactivity, experimental chemical research is seldom performed with radon, and as a result there are very few reported compounds of radon, all either fluorides or oxides. Radon can be oxidized by powerful oxidizing agents such as fluorine, thus forming radon difluoride (RnF_{2}). It decomposes back to its elements at a temperature of above 523 K (250 °C; 482 °F), and is reduced by water to radon gas and hydrogen fluoride: it may also be reduced back to its elements by hydrogen gas. It has a low volatility and was thought to be RnF_{2}. Because of the short half-life of radon and the radioactivity of its compounds, it has not been possible to study the compound in any detail. Theoretical studies on this molecule predict that it should have a Rn–F bond distance of 2.08 ångströms (Å), and that the compound is thermodynamically more stable and less volatile than its lighter counterpart xenon difluoride (XeF_{2}). The octahedral molecule RnF_{6} was predicted to have an even lower enthalpy of formation than the difluoride. The [RnF]^{+} ion is believed to form by the following reaction:

Rn(g) + 2 [O_{2}]^{+}[SbF_{6}]^{−}(s) → [RnF]^{+}[Sb_{2}F_{11}]^{−}(s) + 2 O_{2}(g)

For this reason, antimony pentafluoride together with chlorine trifluoride and N_{2}F_{2}Sb_{2}F_{11} have been considered for radon gas removal in uranium mines due to the formation of radon–fluorine compounds. Radon compounds can be formed by the decay of radium in radium halides, a reaction that has been used to reduce the amount of radon that escapes from targets during irradiation. Additionally, salts of the [RnF]^{+} cation with the anions SbF_{6}^{−}, TaF_{6}^{−}, and BiF_{6}^{−} are known. Radon is also oxidised by dioxygen difluoride to RnF_{2} at 173 K (−100 °C; −148 °F).

Radon oxides are among the few other reported compounds of radon; only the trioxide (RnO_{3}) has been confirmed. The higher fluorides RnF_{4} and RnF_{6} have been claimed, are calculated to be stable, but have not been confirmed. They may have been observed in experiments where unknown radon-containing products distilled together with xenon hexafluoride: these may have been RnF_{4}, RnF_{6}, or both. Trace-scale heating of radon with xenon, fluorine, bromine pentafluoride, and either sodium fluoride or nickel fluoride was claimed to produce a higher fluoride as well which hydrolysed to form RnO_{3}. While it has been suggested that these claims were really due to radon precipitating out as the solid complex [RnF]_{2}^{+}[NiF_{6}]^{2−}, the fact that radon coprecipitates from aqueous solution with CsXeO_{3}F has been taken as confirmation that RnO_{3} was formed, which has been supported by further studies of the hydrolysed solution. That [RnO_{3}F]^{−} did not form in other experiments may have been due to the high concentration of fluoride used. Electromigration studies also suggest the presence of cationic [HRnO_{3}]^{+} and anionic [HRnO_{4}]^{−} forms of radon in weakly acidic aqueous solution (pH > 5), the procedure having previously been validated by examination of the homologous xenon trioxide.

The decay technique has also been used. Avrorin et al. reported in 1982 that ^{212}Fr compounds cocrystallised with their caesium analogues appeared to retain chemically bound radon after electron capture; analogies with xenon suggested the formation of RnO_{3}, but this could not be confirmed.

It is likely that the difficulty in identifying higher fluorides of radon stems from radon being kinetically hindered from being oxidised beyond the divalent state because of the strong ionicity of radon difluoride (RnF_{2}) and the high positive charge on radon in RnF^{+}; spatial separation of RnF_{2} molecules may be necessary to clearly identify higher fluorides of radon, of which RnF_{4} is expected to be more stable than RnF_{6} due to spin–orbit splitting of the 6p shell of radon (Rn^{IV} would have a closed-shell 6s^{2}6p^{2}_{1/2} configuration). Therefore, while RnF_{4} should have a similar stability to xenon tetrafluoride (XeF_{4}), RnF_{6} would likely be much less stable than xenon hexafluoride (XeF_{6}): radon hexafluoride would also probably be a regular octahedral molecule, unlike the distorted octahedral structure of XeF_{6}, because of the inert pair effect. Because radon is quite electropositive for a noble gas, it is possible that radon fluorides actually take on highly fluorine-bridged structures and are not volatile. Extrapolation down the noble gas group would suggest also the possible existence of RnO, RnO_{2}, and RnOF_{4}, as well as the first chemically stable noble gas chlorides RnCl_{2} and RnCl_{4}, but none of these have yet been found.

Radon carbonyl (RnCO) has been predicted to be stable and to have a linear molecular geometry. The molecules Rn_{2} and RnXe were found to be significantly stabilized by spin-orbit coupling. Radon caged inside a fullerene has been proposed as a drug for tumors. Despite the existence of Xe(VIII), no Rn(VIII) compounds have been claimed to exist; RnF_{8} should be highly unstable chemically (XeF_{8} is thermodynamically unstable).

Radon reacts with the liquid halogen fluorides ClF, ClF_{3}, ClF_{5}, BrF_{3}, BrF_{5}, and IF_{7} to form RnF_{2}. In halogen fluoride solution, radon is nonvolatile and exists as the RnF^{+} and Rn^{2+} cations; addition of fluoride anions results in the formation of the complexes RnF_{3}^{−} and RnF_{4}^{2−}, paralleling the chemistry of beryllium(II) and aluminium(III). The standard electrode potential of the Rn^{2+}/Rn couple has been estimated as +2.0 V, although there is no evidence for the formation of stable radon ions or compounds in aqueous solution.

=== Isotopes ===
Radon has no stable isotopes and no standard atomic weight. Thirty-nine radioactive isotopes have been characterized, with mass numbers ranging from 193 to 231. Six of them, from 217 to 222 inclusive, occur naturally. The most stable isotope is ^{222}Rn (half-life 3.82 days), which is a decay product of ^{226}Ra, the latter being itself a decay product of ^{238}U. A trace amount of the (highly unstable) isotope ^{218}Rn (half-life about 35 milliseconds) is also among the daughters of ^{222}Rn. The isotope ^{216}Rn would be produced by the double beta decay of natural ^{216}Po; while energetically possible, this process has however never been seen.

Three other radon isotopes have a half-life of over an hour: ^{211}Rn (about 15 hours), ^{210}Rn (2.4 hours) and ^{224}Rn (about 1.8 hours). However, none of these three occur naturally. ^{220}Rn, also called thoron, is a natural decay product of the most stable thorium isotope (^{232}Th). It has a half-life of 55.6 seconds and also emits alpha radiation. Similarly, ^{219}Rn is derived from the most stable isotope of actinium (^{227}Ac)—named "actinon"—and is an alpha emitter with a half-life of 3.96 seconds.

The radium or uranium series

=== Daughters ===
^{222}Rn belongs to the radium and uranium-238 decay chain, and has a half-life of 3.8235 days. Its first four products (excluding marginal decay schemes) are very short-lived, meaning that the corresponding disintegrations are indicative of the initial radon distribution. Its decay goes through the following sequence (only main decay branches shown):

- ^{222}Rn, 3.82 days, alpha decaying to...
- ^{218}Po, 3.10 minutes, alpha decaying to...
- ^{214}Pb, 26.8 minutes, beta decaying to...
- ^{214}Bi, 19.9 minutes, beta decaying to...
- ^{214}Po, 0.1643 ms, alpha decaying to...
- ^{210}Pb, which has a much longer half-life of 22.3 years, beta decaying to...
- ^{210}Bi, 5.013 days, beta decaying to...
- ^{210}Po, 138.376 days, alpha decaying to...
- ^{206}Pb, stable

The radon equilibrium factor is the ratio between the activity of all short-period radon progenies (which are responsible for most of radon's biological effects), and the activity that would be at equilibrium with the radon parent.

If a closed volume is constantly supplied with radon, the concentration of short-lived isotopes will increase until an equilibrium is reached where the overall decay rate of the decay products equals that of the radon itself. The equilibrium factor is 1 when both activities are equal, meaning that the decay products have stayed close to the radon parent long enough for the equilibrium to be reached, within a couple of hours. Under these conditions, each additional pCi/L of radon will increase exposure by 0.01 working level (WL, a measure of radioactivity commonly used in mining). These conditions are not always met; in many homes, the equilibrium factor is typically 40%; that is, there will be 0.004 WL of daughters for each pCi/L of radon in the air. ^{210}Pb takes much longer to come in equilibrium with radon, dependent on environmental factors, but if the environment permits accumulation of dust over extended periods of time, ^{210}Pb and its decay products may contribute to overall radiation levels as well. Several studies on the radioactive equilibrium of elements in the environment find it more useful to use the ratio of other ^{222}Rn decay products with ^{210}Pb, such as ^{210}Po, in measuring overall radiation levels.

Because of their electrostatic charge, radon progenies adhere to surfaces or dust particles, whereas gaseous radon does not. Attachment removes them from the air, usually causing the equilibrium factor in the atmosphere to be less than 1. The equilibrium factor is also lowered by air circulation or air filtration devices, and is increased by airborne dust particles, including cigarette smoke. The equilibrium factor found in epidemiological studies is 0.4.

== History and etymology ==
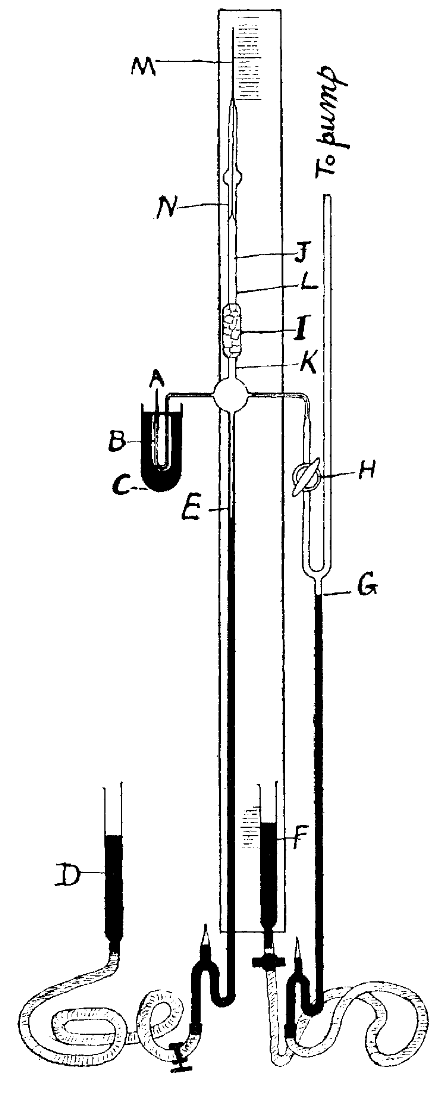
Apparatus used by Ramsay and Whytlaw-Gray to isolate radon. M is a capillary tube, where approximately 0.1 mm^{3} were isolated. Radon mixed with hydrogen entered the evacuated system through siphon A; mercury is shown in black.

Radon was discovered in 1899 by Ernest Rutherford and Robert B. Owens at McGill University in Montreal. It was the fifth radioactive element to be discovered, after uranium, thorium, radium, and polonium. In 1899, Pierre and Marie Curie observed that the gas emitted by radium remained radioactive for a month. Later that year, Rutherford and Owens noticed variations when trying to measure radiation from thorium oxide. Rutherford noticed that the compounds of thorium continuously emit a radioactive gas that remains radioactive for several minutes, and called this gas "emanation" (from Latin: emanare, to flow out, and emanatio, expiration), and later "thorium emanation" ("Th Em"). In 1900, Friedrich Ernst Dorn reported some experiments in which he noticed that radium compounds emanate a radioactive gas he named "radium emanation" ("Ra Em"). In 1901, Rutherford and Harriet Brooks demonstrated that the emanations are radioactive, but credited the Curies for the discovery of the element. In 1903, similar emanations were observed from actinium by André-Louis Debierne, and were called "actinium emanation" ("Ac Em").

Several shortened names were soon suggested for the three emanations: exradio, exthorio, and exactinio in 1904; radon (Ro), thoron (To), and akton or acton (Ao) in 1918; radeon, thoreon, and actineon in 1919, and eventually radon, thoron, and actinon in 1920. The likeness of the spectra of these three gases with those of argon, krypton, and xenon, and their observed chemical inertia led Sir William Ramsay to suggest in 1904 that the "emanations" might contain a new element of the noble-gas family.

In 1909, Ramsay and Robert Whytlaw-Gray isolated radon and determined its melting temperature and critical point. Because it does not conform to expected periodic trends, their obtained melting point (the only experimental value) was questioned in 1925 by Friedrich Paneth and E. Rabinowitsch, but ab initio Monte Carlo simulations from 2018 agree almost exactly with Ramsay and Gray's result. In 1910, they determined its density (that showed it was the heaviest known gas) and its position in the periodic table. They wrote that "L'expression l'émanation du radium est fort incommode" ("the expression 'radium emanation' is very awkward") and suggested the new name niton (Nt) (from Latin: nitens, shining) to emphasize the radioluminescence property, and in 1912 it was accepted by the International Commission for Atomic Weights. In 1923, the International Committee for Chemical Elements and International Union of Pure and Applied Chemistry (IUPAC) chose the name of the most stable isotope, radon, as the name of the element. The isotopes thoron and actinon were later renamed ^{220}Rn and ^{219}Rn. This has caused some confusion in the literature regarding the element's discovery as while Dorn had discovered radon the isotope, he was not the first to discover radon the element.

As late as the 1960s, the element was also referred to simply as emanation. The first synthesized compound of radon, radon fluoride, was obtained in 1962. Even today, the word radon may refer to either the element or its isotope ^{222}Rn, with thoron remaining in use as a short name for ^{220}Rn to stem this ambiguity. The name actinon for ^{219}Rn is rarely encountered today, probably due to the short half-life of that isotope.

The danger of high exposure to radon in mines, where exposures can reach 1,000,000 Bq/m^{3}, has long been known. In 1530, Paracelsus described a wasting disease of miners, the mala metallorum, and Georg Agricola recommended ventilation in mines to avoid this mountain sickness (Bergsucht). In 1879, this condition was identified as lung cancer by Harting and Hesse in their investigation of miners from Schneeberg, Germany. The first major studies with radon and health occurred in the context of uranium mining in the Joachimsthal region of Bohemia. In the US, studies and mitigation only followed decades of health effects on uranium miners of the Southwestern US employed during the early Cold War; standards were not implemented until 1971.

In the early 20th century in the US, gold contaminated with the radon daughter ^{210}Pb entered the precious metal supply chain of that country's jewelry industry. Gold brachytherapy seeds that had held ^{222}Rn were illicitly or unknowingly sold and melted down.

The presence of radon in indoor air was documented as early as 1950. Beginning in the 1970s, research was initiated to address sources of indoor radon, determinants of concentration, health effects, and mitigation approaches. In the US, the problem of indoor radon received widespread publicity and intensified investigation after a widely publicized incident in 1984. During routine monitoring at a Pennsylvania nuclear power plant, a worker was found to be contaminated with radioactivity. A high concentration of radon in his home was subsequently identified as responsible.

== Occurrence ==
=== Concentration units ===
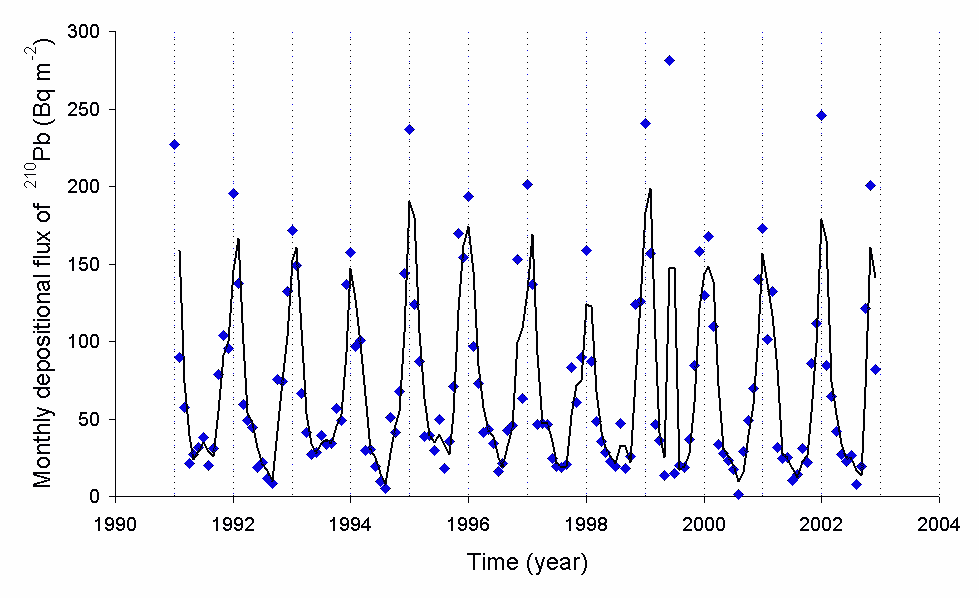
^{210}Pb is formed from the decay of ^{222}Rn. Here is a typical deposition rate of ^{210}Pb as observed in Japan as a function of time, due to variations in radon concentration.

Discussions of radon concentrations in the environment refer to ^{222}Rn, the decay product of uranium and radium. While the average rate of production of ^{220}Rn (from the thorium decay series) is about the same as that of ^{222}Rn, the amount of ^{220}Rn in the environment is much less than that of ^{222}Rn because of the short half-life of ^{220}Rn (55 seconds, versus 3.8 days respectively).

Radon concentration in the atmosphere is usually measured in becquerel per cubic meter (Bq/m^{3}), the SI derived unit. Another unit of measurement common in the US is picocuries per liter (pCi/L); 1 pCi/L = 37 Bq/m^{3}. Typical domestic exposures average about 48 Bq/m^{3} indoors, though this varies widely, and 15 Bq/m^{3} outdoors.

In the mining industry, the exposure is traditionally measured in working level (WL), and the cumulative exposure in working level month (WLM); 1 WL equals any combination of short-lived ^{222}Rn daughters (^{218}Po, ^{214}Pb, ^{214}Bi, and ^{214}Po) in 1 liter of air that releases 1.3 × 10^{5} MeV of potential alpha energy; 1 WL is equivalent to 2.08 × 10^{−5} joules per cubic meter of air (J/m^{3}). The SI unit of cumulative exposure is expressed in joule-hours per cubic meter (J·h/m^{3}). One WLM is equivalent to 3.6 × 10^{−3} J h/m^{3}. An exposure to 1 WL for 1 working-month (170 hours) equals 1 WLM cumulative exposure. The International Commission on Radiological Protection recommends an annual limit of 4.8WLM for miners. Assuming 2000 hours of work per year, this corresponds to a concentration of 1500 Bq/m^{3}.

^{222}Rn decays to ^{210}Pb and other radioisotopes. The levels of ^{210}Pb can be measured. The rate of deposition of this radioisotope is weather-dependent.

Radon concentrations found in natural environments are much too low to be detected by chemical means. A 1,000 Bq/m^{3} (relatively high) concentration corresponds to 0.17 picogram per cubic meter (pg/m^{3}). The average concentration of radon in the atmosphere is about 6×10^{−18} molar percent, or about 150 atoms in each milliliter of air. The radon activity of the entire Earth's atmosphere originates from only a few tens of grams of radon, consistently replaced by decay of larger amounts of radium, thorium, and uranium.

=== Natural ===
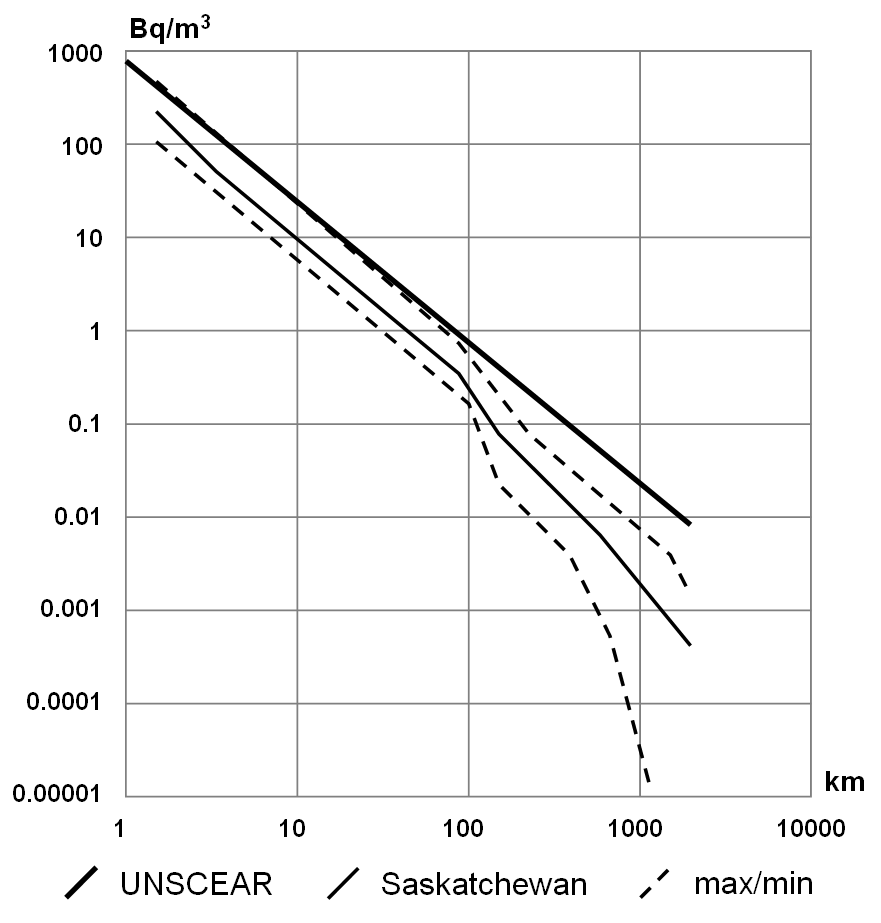
Radon concentration next to a uranium mine

Radon is produced by the radioactive decay of radium-226, which is found in uranium ores, phosphate rock, shales, igneous and metamorphic rocks such as granite, gneiss, and schist, and to a lesser degree, in common rocks such as limestone. Every square mile of surface soil, to a depth of 6 inches (2.6 km^{2} to a depth of 15 cm), contains about 1 gram of radium, which releases radon in small amounts to the atmosphere. It is estimated that 2.4 billion curies (90 EBq) of radon are released from soil annually worldwide. This is equivalent to some 15.3 kilograms (34 lb).

Radon concentration can differ widely from place to place. In the open air, it ranges from 1 to 100 Bq/m^{3}, even less (0.1 Bq/m^{3}) above the ocean. In the United States, the average outdoor radon level is estimated to be 15 Bq/m^{3} (0.4 pCi/L). In caves or ventilated mines, or poorly ventilated houses, its concentration climbs to 20–2,000 Bq/m^{3}.

Radon concentration can be much higher in mining contexts. Ventilation regulations instruct to maintain radon concentration in uranium mines under the "working level", with 95th percentile levels ranging up to nearly 3 WL (546 pCi ^{222}Rn per liter of air; 20.2 kBq/m^{3}, measured from 1976 to 1985). The concentration in the air at the (unventilated) Gastein Healing Gallery averages 43 kBq/m^{3} (1.2 nCi/L) with maximal value of 160 kBq/m^{3} (4.3 nCi/L).

Radon mostly appears with the radium/uranium series (decay chain) (^{222}Rn), and marginally with the thorium series (^{220}Rn). The element emanates naturally from the ground, and some building materials, all over the world, wherever traces of uranium or thorium are found, and particularly in regions with soils containing granite or shale, which have a higher concentration of uranium. Not all granitic regions are prone to high emissions of radon. Being a rare gas, it usually migrates freely through faults and fragmented soils, and may accumulate in caves or water. Owing to its very short half-life (four days for ^{222}Rn), radon concentration decreases very quickly when the distance from the production area increases. Radon concentration varies greatly with season and atmospheric conditions. For instance, it has been shown to accumulate in the air if there is a meteorological inversion and little wind.

High concentrations of radon can be found in some spring waters and hot springs. The towns of Boulder, Montana; Misasa; Bad Kreuznach, Germany; and the country of Japan have radium-rich springs that emit radon. To be classified as a radon mineral water, radon concentration must be above 2 nCi/L (74 kBq/m^{3}). The activity of radon mineral water reaches 2 MBq/m^{3} in Merano and 4 MBq/m^{3} in Lurisia (Italy).

Natural radon concentrations in the Earth's atmosphere are so low that radon-rich water in contact with the atmosphere will continually lose radon by volatilization. Hence, ground water has a higher concentration of ^{222}Rn than surface water, because radon is continuously produced by radioactive decay of ^{226}Ra present in rocks. Likewise, the saturated zone of a soil frequently has a higher radon content than the unsaturated zone because of diffusional losses to the atmosphere.

In 1971, Apollo 15 passed 110 km (68 mi) above the Aristarchus plateau on the Moon, and detected a significant rise in alpha particles thought to be caused by the decay of ^{222}Rn. The presence of ^{222}Rn has been inferred later from data obtained from the Lunar Prospector alpha particle spectrometer.

Radon is found in some petroleum. Because radon has a similar pressure and temperature curve to propane, and oil refineries separate petrochemicals based on their boiling points, the piping carrying freshly separated propane in oil refineries can become contaminated because of decaying radon and its products.

Residues from the petroleum and natural gas industry often contain radium and its daughters. The sulfate scale from an oil well can be radium rich, while the water, oil, and gas from a well often contains radon. Radon decays to form solid radioisotopes that form coatings on the inside of pipework.

=== Accumulation in buildings ===
Measurement of radon levels in the first decades of its discovery was mainly done to determine the presence of radium and uranium in geological surveys. In 1956, most likely the first indoor survey of radon decay products was performed in Sweden, with the intent of estimating the public exposure to radon and its decay products. From 1975 up until 1984, small studies in Sweden, Austria, the United States and Norway aimed to measure radon indoors and in metropolitan areas.

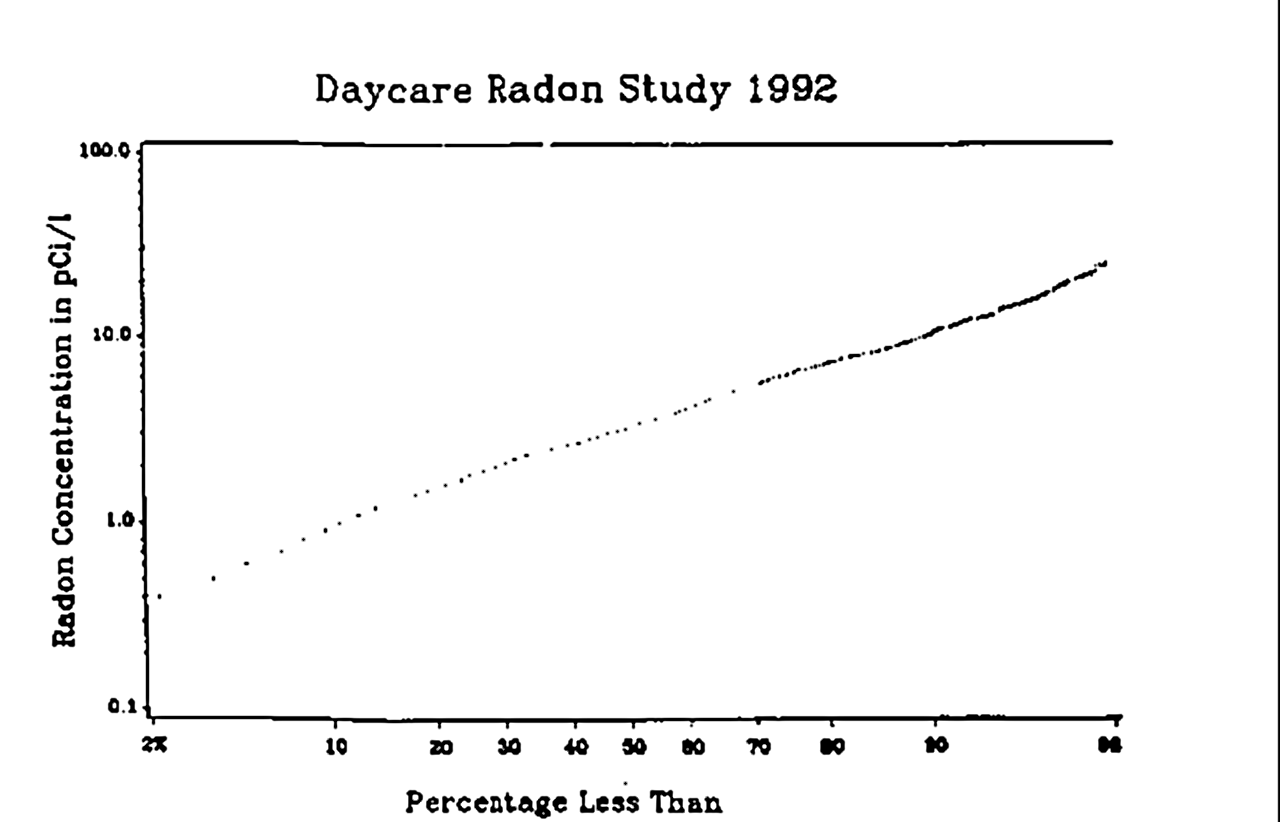
Typical log-normal radon distribution in dwellings

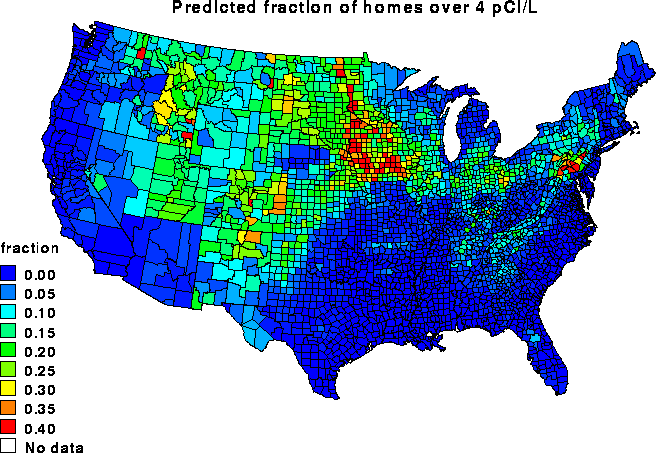
Predicted fraction of U.S. homes having concentrations of radon exceeding the EPA's recommended action level of 4 pCi/L

High concentrations of radon in homes were discovered by chance in 1984 after the stringent radiation testing conducted at the new Limerick Generating Station nuclear power plant in Montgomery County, Pennsylvania, United States revealed that Stanley Watras, a construction engineer at the plant, was contaminated by radioactive substances even though the reactor had never been fueled and Watras had been decontaminated each evening. It was determined that radon levels in his home's basement were in excess of 100,000 Bq/m^{3} (2.7 nCi/L); he was told that living in the home was the equivalent of smoking 135 packs of cigarettes a day, and he and his family had increased their risk of developing lung cancer by 13 or 14 percent. The incident dramatized the fact that radon levels in particular dwellings can occasionally be orders of magnitude higher than typical. Since the incident in Pennsylvania, millions of short-term radon measurements have been taken in homes in the United States. Outside the United States, radon measurements are typically performed over the long term.

In the United States, typical domestic exposures are of approximately 50 Bq/m^{3} (1.3 pCi/L) indoors. Some level of radon will be found in all buildings. Radon mostly enters a building directly from the soil through the lowest level in the building that is in contact with the ground. High levels of radon in the water supply can also increase indoor radon air levels. Typical entry points of radon into buildings are cracks in solid foundations and walls, construction joints, gaps in suspended floors and around service pipes, cavities inside walls, and the water supply. Radon concentrations in the same place may differ by double/half over one hour, and the concentration in one room of a building may be significantly different from the concentration in an adjoining room.

The distribution of radon concentrations will generally differ from room to room, and the readings are averaged according to regulatory protocols. Indoor radon concentration is usually assumed to follow a log-normal distribution on a given territory. Thus, the geometric mean is generally used for estimating the "average" radon concentration in an area. The mean concentration ranges from less than 10 Bq/m^{3} to over 100 Bq/m^{3} in some European countries.

Some of the highest radon hazard in the US is found in Iowa and in the Appalachian Mountain areas in southeastern Pennsylvania. Iowa has the highest average radon concentrations in the US due to significant glaciation that ground the granitic rocks from the Canadian Shield and deposited it as soils making up the rich Iowa farmland. Many cities within the state, such as Iowa City, have passed requirements for radon-resistant construction in new homes. The second highest readings in Ireland were found in office buildings in the Irish town of Mallow, County Cork, prompting local fears regarding lung cancer.

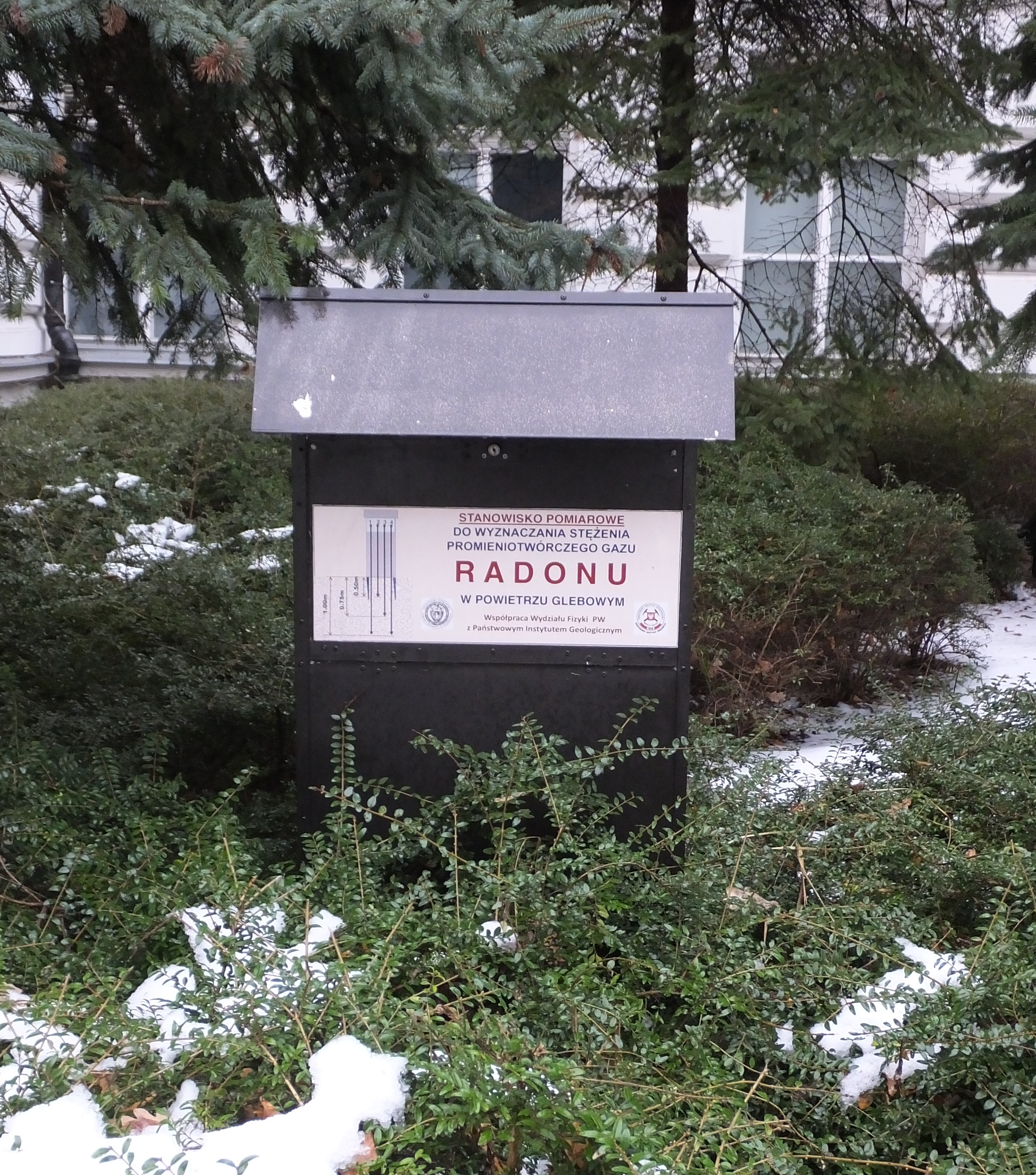
A fixed-location device to measure soil concentrations of radon at the Warsaw University of Technology

Since radon is a colorless, odorless gas, the only way to know how much is present in the air or water is to perform tests. In the US, radon test kits are available to the public at retail stores, such as hardware stores, for home use, and testing is available through licensed professionals, who are often home inspectors. Efforts to reduce indoor radon levels are called radon mitigation. In the US, the EPA recommends all houses be tested for radon. In the UK, under the Housing Health & Safety Rating System, property owners have an obligation to evaluate potential risks and hazards to health and safety in a residential property. Alpha-radiation monitoring over the long term is a method of testing for radon that is more common in countries outside the United States.

=== Industrial production ===
Radon is obtained as a by-product of uraniferous ores processing after transferring into 1% solutions of hydrochloric or hydrobromic acids. The gas mixture extracted from the solutions contains H_{2}, O_{2}, He, Rn, CO_{2}, H_{2}O and hydrocarbons. The mixture is purified by passing it over copper at 993 K (720 °C; 1,328 °F) to remove the H_{2} and the O_{2}, and then KOH and P_{2}O_{5} are used to remove the acids and moisture by sorption. Radon is condensed by liquid nitrogen and purified from residue gases by sublimation.

Radon commercialization is regulated, but it is available in small quantities for the calibration of ^{222}Rn measurement systems. In 2008 it was priced at almost US$6,000 (equivalent to $8,972 in 2025) per milliliter of radium solution (which only contains about 15 picograms of actual radon at any given moment). Radon is produced commercially by a solution of radium-226 (half-life of 1,600 years). Radium-226 decays by alpha-particle emission, producing radon that collects over samples of radium-226 at a rate of about 1 mm^{3}/day per gram of radium; equilibrium is quickly achieved and radon is produced in a steady flow, with an activity equal to that of the radium (50 Bq). Gaseous ^{222}Rn (half-life of about four days) escapes from the capsule through diffusion. Radon sources have also been produced for scientific purposes through the implantation of radium-226 into solid stainless steel.

=== Concentration scale ===
Bq/m^{3}	pCi/L	Occurrence example
1	~0.027	Radon concentration at the shores of large oceans is typically 1 Bq/m^{3}. Radon trace concentration above oceans or in Antarctica can be lower than 0.1 Bq/m^{3}, with changes in radon levels being used to track foreign pollutants.
10	0.27	Mean continental concentration in the open air: 10 to 30 Bq/m^{3}. An EPA survey of 11,000 homes across the USA found an average of 46 Bq/m^{3}.
100	2.7	Typical indoor domestic exposure. Most countries have adopted a radon concentration of 200–400 Bq/m^{3} for indoor air as an Action or Reference Level.
1,000	27	Very high radon concentrations (>1000 Bq/m^{3}) have been found in houses built on soils with a high uranium content and/or high permeability of the ground. If levels are 20 picocuries radon per liter of air (800 Bq/m^{3}) or higher, the home owner should consider some type of procedure to decrease indoor radon levels. Allowable concentrations in uranium mines are approximately 1,220 Bq/m^{3} (33 pCi/L)
10,000	270	The concentration in the air at the (unventilated) Gastein Healing Gallery averages 43 kBq/m^{3} (about 1.2 nCi/L) with maximal value of 160 kBq/m^{3} (about 4.3 nCi/L).
100,000	~2700	About 100,000 Bq/m^{3} (2.7 nCi/L) was measured in Stanley Watras's basement.
1,000,000	27000	Concentrations reaching 1,000,000 Bq/m^{3} can be found in unventilated uranium mines.
~5.54 × 10^{19}	~1.5 × 10^{18}	Theoretical upper limit: Radon gas (^{222}Rn) at 100% concentration (1 atmosphere, 0 °C); 1.538×10^{5} curies/gram; 5.54×10^{19} Bq/m^{3}.

== Applications ==
=== Medical ===
==== Hormesis ====
An early-20th-century form of quackery was the treatment of maladies in a radiotorium. It was a small, sealed room for patients to be exposed to radon for its "medicinal effects". The carcinogenic nature of radon due to its ionizing radiation became apparent later. Radon's molecule-damaging radioactivity has been used to kill cancerous cells, but it does not increase the health of healthy cells. The ionizing radiation causes the formation of free radicals, which results in cell damage, causing increased rates of illness, including cancer.

Exposure to radon has been suggested to mitigate autoimmune diseases such as arthritis in a process known as radiation hormesis. As a result, in the late 20th century and early 21st century, "health mines" established in Basin, Montana, attracted people seeking relief from health problems such as arthritis through limited exposure to radioactive mine water and radon. The practice is discouraged because of the well-documented ill effects of high doses of radiation on the body.

Radioactive water baths have been applied since 1906 in Jáchymov, Czech Republic, but even before radon discovery they were used in Bad Gastein, Austria. Radium-rich springs are also used in traditional Japanese onsen in Misasa, Tottori Prefecture. Drinking therapy is applied in Bad Brambach, Germany, and during the early 20th century, water from springs with radon in them was bottled and sold (this water had little to no radon in it by the time it got to consumers due to radon's short half-life). Inhalation therapy is carried out in Gasteiner-Heilstollen, Austria; Świeradów-Zdrój, Czerniawa-Zdrój, Kowary, Lądek-Zdrój, Poland; Harghita Băi, Romania; and Boulder, Montana. In the US and Europe, there are several "radon spas", where people sit for minutes or hours in a high-radon atmosphere, such as at Bad Schmiedeberg, Germany.

==== Nuclear medicine ====
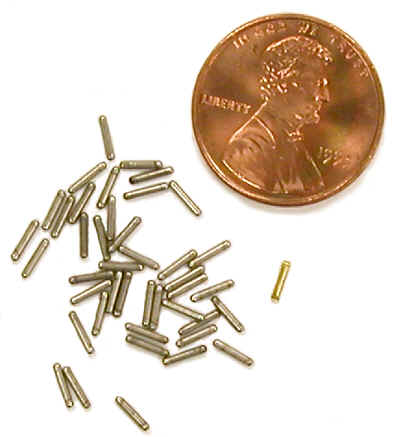
^{222}Rn- and ^{125}I-containing seeds used in brachytherapy

Radon has been produced commercially for use in radiation therapy, but for the most part has been replaced by radionuclides made in particle accelerators and nuclear reactors. Radon has been used in implantable seeds, made of gold or glass, primarily used to treat cancers, known as brachytherapy. The gold seeds were produced by filling a long tube with radon pumped from a radium source, the tube being then divided into short sections by crimping and cutting. The gold layer keeps the radon within, and filters out the alpha and beta radiations, while allowing the gamma rays to escape (which kill the diseased tissue). The activities might range from 0.05 to 5 millicuries per seed (2 to 200 MBq). The gamma rays are produced by radon and the first short-lived elements of its decay chain (^{218}Po, ^{214}Pb, ^{214}Bi, ^{214}Po).

After 11 half-lives (42 days), radon radioactivity is at 1/2,048 of its original level. At this stage, the predominant residual activity of the seed originates from the radon decay product ^{210}Pb, whose half-life (22.3 years) is 2,000 times that of radon and its descendants ^{210}Bi and ^{210}Po.

^{211}Rn can be used to generate ^{211}At, which has uses in targeted alpha therapy.

=== Scientific ===
Radon emanation from the soil varies with soil type and with surface uranium content, so outdoor radon concentrations can be used to track air masses to a limited degree. (Note: See radon storm.) Because of radon's rapid loss to air and comparatively rapid decay, radon is used in hydrologic research that studies the interaction between groundwater and streams. Any significant concentration of radon in a river may be an indicator that there are local inputs of groundwater.

Radon soil concentration has been used to map buried close-subsurface geological faults because concentrations are generally higher over the faults. Similarly, it has found some limited use in prospecting for geothermal gradients.

Some researchers have investigated changes in groundwater radon concentrations for earthquake prediction. Increases in radon were noted before the 1966 Tashkent and 1994 Mindoro earthquakes. Radon has a half-life of approximately 3.8 days, which means that it can be found only shortly after it has been produced in the radioactive decay chain. For this reason, it has been hypothesized that increases in radon concentration is due to the generation of new cracks underground, which would allow increased groundwater circulation, flushing out radon. The generation of new cracks might not unreasonably be assumed to precede major earthquakes. In the 1970s and 1980s, scientific measurements of radon emissions near faults found that earthquakes often occurred with no radon signal, and radon was often detected with no earthquake to follow. It was then dismissed by many as an unreliable indicator. As of 2009, it was under investigation as a possible earthquake precursor by NASA; further research into the subject has suggested that abnormalities in atmospheric radon concentrations can be an indicator of seismic movement.

Radon is a known pollutant emitted from geothermal power stations because it is present in the material pumped from deep underground. It disperses rapidly, and no radiological hazard has been demonstrated in various investigations. In addition, typical systems re-inject the material deep underground rather than releasing it at the surface, so its environmental impact is minimal. In 1989, a survey of the collective dose received due to radon in geothermal fluids was measured at 2 man-sieverts per gigawatt-year of electricity produced, in comparison to the 2.5 man-sieverts per gigawatt-year produced from ^{14}C emissions in nuclear power plants.

In the 1940s and 1950s, radon produced from a radium source was used for industrial radiography. Other X-ray sources such as ^{60}Co and ^{192}Ir became available after World War II and quickly replaced radium and thus radon for this purpose, being of lower cost and hazard.

== Health risks ==
=== In mines ===
^{222}Rn decay products have been classified by the International Agency for Research on Cancer as being carcinogenic to humans, and as a gas that can be inhaled, lung cancer is a particular concern for people exposed to elevated levels of radon for sustained periods. During the 1940s and 1950s, when safety standards requiring expensive ventilation in mines were not widely implemented, radon exposure was linked to lung cancer among non-smoking miners of uranium and other hard rock materials in what is now the Czech Republic, and later among miners from the Southwestern US and South Australia. Despite these hazards being known in the early 1950s, this occupational hazard remained poorly managed in many mines until the 1970s. During this period, several entrepreneurs opened former uranium mines in the US to the general public and advertised alleged health benefits from breathing radon gas underground. Health benefits claimed included relief from pain, sinus problems, asthma, and arthritis, but the government banned such advertisements in 1975, and subsequent works have debated the truth of such claimed health effects, citing the documented ill effects of radiation on the body.

Since that time, ventilation and other measures have been used to reduce radon levels in most affected mines that continue to operate. In recent years, the average annual exposure of uranium miners has fallen to levels similar to the concentrations inhaled in some homes. This has reduced the risk of occupationally induced cancer from radon, although health issues may persist for those who are currently employed in affected mines and for those who have been employed in them in the past. As the relative risk for miners has decreased, so has the ability to detect excess risks among that population.

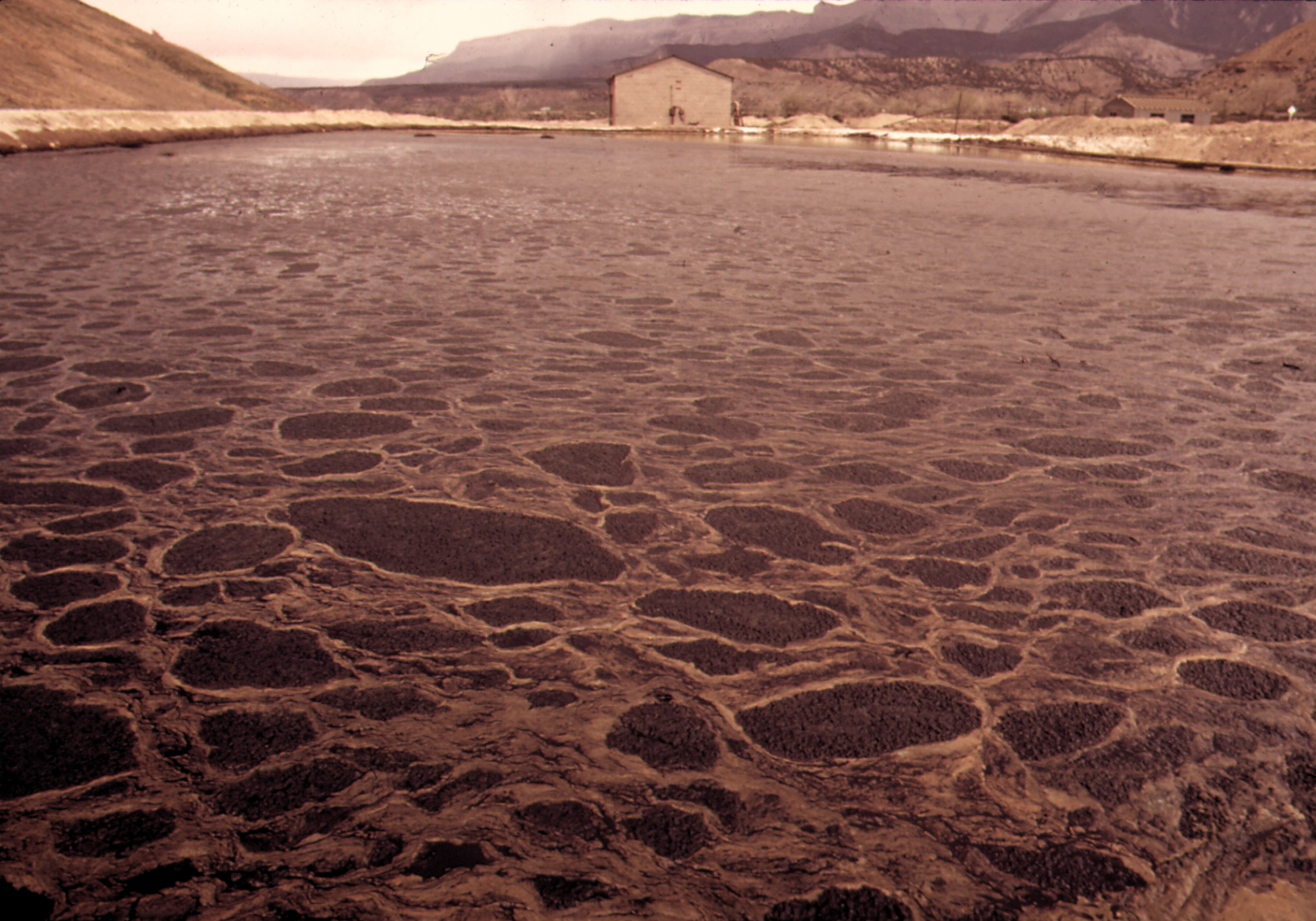
A tailing pond near Rifle, Colorado. Waste from uranium mining has been allowed to settle and is exposed to the atmosphere, leading to the release of radon gas into the air and decay products into the groundwater.

Residues from processing of uranium ore can also be a source of radon. Radon resulting from the high radium content in uncovered dumps and tailing ponds can be easily released into the atmosphere and affect people living in the vicinity. The release of radon may be mitigated by covering tailings with soil or clay, though other decay products may leach into groundwater supplies.

Non-uranium mines may pose higher risks of radon exposure, as workers are not continuously monitored for radiation, and regulations specific to uranium mines do not apply. A review of radon level measurements across non-uranium mines found the highest concentrations of radon in non-metal mines, such as phosphorus and salt mines. However, older or abandoned uranium mines without ventilation may still have extremely high radon levels.

In addition to lung cancer, researchers have theorized a possible increased risk of leukemia due to radon exposure. Empirical support from studies of the general population is inconsistent; a study of uranium miners found a correlation between radon exposure and chronic lymphocytic leukemia, and current research supports a link between indoor radon exposure and poor health outcomes (i.e., an increased risk of lung cancer or childhood leukemia). Legal actions taken by those involved in nuclear industries, including miners, millers, transporters, nuclear site workers, and their respective unions have resulted in compensation for those affected by radon and radiation exposure under programs such as the compensation scheme for radiation-linked diseases (in the United Kingdom) and the Radiation Exposure Compensation Act (in the United States).

=== Domestic-level exposure ===
Radon has been considered the second leading cause of lung cancer in the United States and leading environmental cause of cancer mortality by the EPA, with the first one being smoking. Others have reached similar conclusions for the United Kingdom and France. Radon exposure in buildings may arise from subsurface rock formations and certain building materials (e.g., some granites). The greatest risk of radon exposure arises in buildings that are airtight, insufficiently ventilated, and have foundation leaks that allow air from the soil into basements and dwelling rooms. In some regions, such as Niška Banja, Serbia and in Ullensvang, Norway, outdoor radon concentrations may be exceptionally high, though compared to indoors, where people spend more time and air is not dispersed and exchanged as often, outdoor exposure to radon is not considered a significant health risk.

Radon exposure (mostly radon daughters) has been linked to lung cancer in case-control studies performed in the US, Europe and China. There are approximately 21,000 deaths per year in the US (0.0063% of a population of 333 million) due to radon-induced lung cancers. In Europe, 2% of all cancers have been attributed to radon; in Slovenia in particular, a country with a high concentration of radon, about 120 people (0.0057% of a population of 2.11 million) die yearly because of radon. One of the most comprehensive radon studies performed in the US by epidemiologist R. William Field and colleagues found a 50% increased lung cancer risk even at the protracted exposures at the EPA's action level of 4 pCi/L. North American and European pooled analyses further support these findings. However, the conclusion that exposure to low levels of radon leads to elevated risk of lung cancer has been disputed, and analyses of the literature point towards elevated risk only when radon accumulates indoors and at levels above 100 Bq/m^{3}.

Thoron (^{220}Rn) is less studied than ^{222}Rn in regards to domestic exposure due to its shorter half-life. However, it has been measured at comparatively high concentrations in buildings with earthen architecture, such as traditional half-timbered houses and modern houses with clay wall finishes, and in regions with thorium- and monazite-rich soil and sand. Thoron is a minor contributor to the overall radiation dose received due to indoor radon exposure, and can interfere with ^{222}Rn measurements when not taken into account.

==== Action and reference level ====
WHO presented in 2009 a recommended reference level (the national reference level), 100 Bq/m^{3}, for radon in dwellings. The recommendation also says that where this is not possible, 300 Bq/m^{3} should be selected as the highest level. A national reference level should not be a limit, but should represent the maximum acceptable annual average radon concentration in a dwelling.

The actionable concentration of radon in a home varies depending on the organization doing the recommendation, for example, the EPA encourages that action be taken at concentrations as low as 74 Bq/m^{3} (2 pCi/L), and the European Union recommends action be taken when concentrations reach 400 Bq/m^{3} (11 pCi/L) for old houses and 200 Bq/m^{3} (5 pCi/L) for new ones. On 8 July 2010, the UK's Health Protection Agency issued new advice setting a "Target Level" of 100 Bq/m^{3} whilst retaining an "Action Level" of 200 Bq/m^{3}. Similar levels (as in the UK) are published by Norwegian Radiation and Nuclear Safety Authority (DSA) with the maximum limit for schools, kindergartens, and new dwellings set at 200 Bq/m^{3}, where 100 Bq/m^{3} is set as the action level.

==== Inhalation and smoking ====
Results from epidemiological studies indicate that the risk of lung cancer increases with exposure to residential radon. One well known potential source of error in these studies is smoking, which is the main risk factor for lung cancer. In the US, cigarette smoking is estimated to cause 80% to 90% of all lung cancers.

Radon, like other known or suspected external risk factors for lung cancer, is a threat for smokers and former smokers. According to the EPA, the risk of lung cancer for smokers is significantly higher when they are exposed to radon due to the synergistic effects of radon with smoking. For this population, about 62 people in a total of 1,000 will die of lung cancer, compared to 7 people in a total of 1,000 for people who have never smoked. A 2005 review article by Darby and colleagues analyzing 13 different case studies across Europe stated: "It is not appropriate to talk simply of a risk from radon in homes. The risk is from smoking, compounded by a synergistic effect of radon for smokers. Without smoking, the effect seems to be so small as to be insignificant." According to Darby, there is a difference in risk for the histological subtypes of lung cancer and radon exposure. Small-cell lung carcinoma, which has a high correlation with smoking, has a higher risk after radon exposure. For other histological subtypes, such as adenocarcinoma, the type that primarily affects non-smokers, the risk from radon appears to be lower.

A 2008 study of radiation from post-mastectomy radiotherapy showed that the simple models previously used to assess the combined and separate risks from radiation and smoking were in need of development. The frequently used linear no-threshold model that describes how the body responds to and is damaged by radiation is one of these models.

==== Absorption and ingestion from water ====
The biological half-life of ingested radon ranges from 30 to 70 minutes, with 90% removal at 100 minutes. In 1999, the US National Research Council investigated the issue of radon in drinking water. The risk associated with ingestion was considered almost negligible. The World Health Organization (WHO) recommends a maximum water contamination level of 100 Bq/L, while the US Environmental Protection Agency recommends a maximum of 11.1 Bq/L. The WHO also advises a maximum annual dose of 1 mSv^{−1} induced by radon from drinking water.

Water from underground sources may contain significant amounts of radon depending on the surrounding rock and soil conditions, whereas surface sources generally do not. Radon is also released from water when temperature is increased, pressure is decreased and when water is aerated. Optimum conditions for radon release and exposure in domestic living from water occurred during showering. Water with a radon concentration of 10^{4} pCi/L can increase the indoor airborne radon concentration by 1 pCi/L under normal conditions. However, the concentration of radon released from contaminated groundwater to the air has been measured at 5 orders of magnitude less than the original concentration in water.

Ocean surface concentrations of radon exchange within the atmosphere, causing ^{222}Rn to increase through the air-sea interface. Although areas tested were very shallow, additional measurements in a wide variety of coastal regimes should help define the nature of ^{222}Rn observed.

=== Testing and mitigation ===
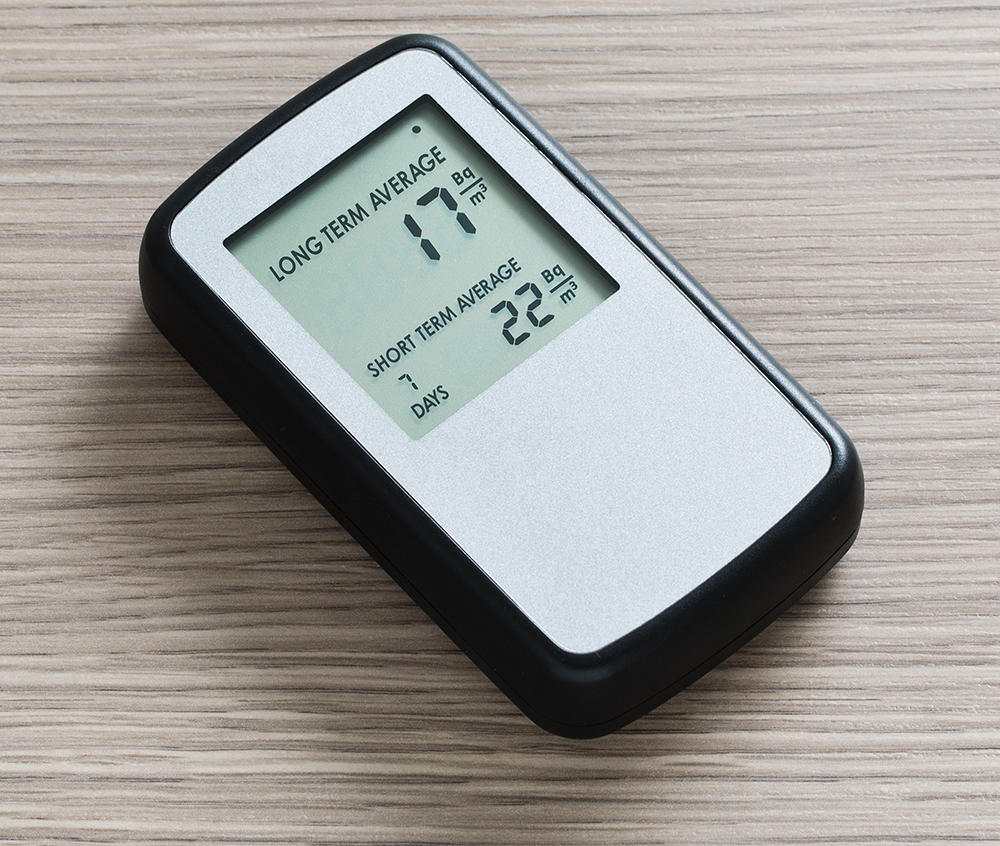
A digital radon detector

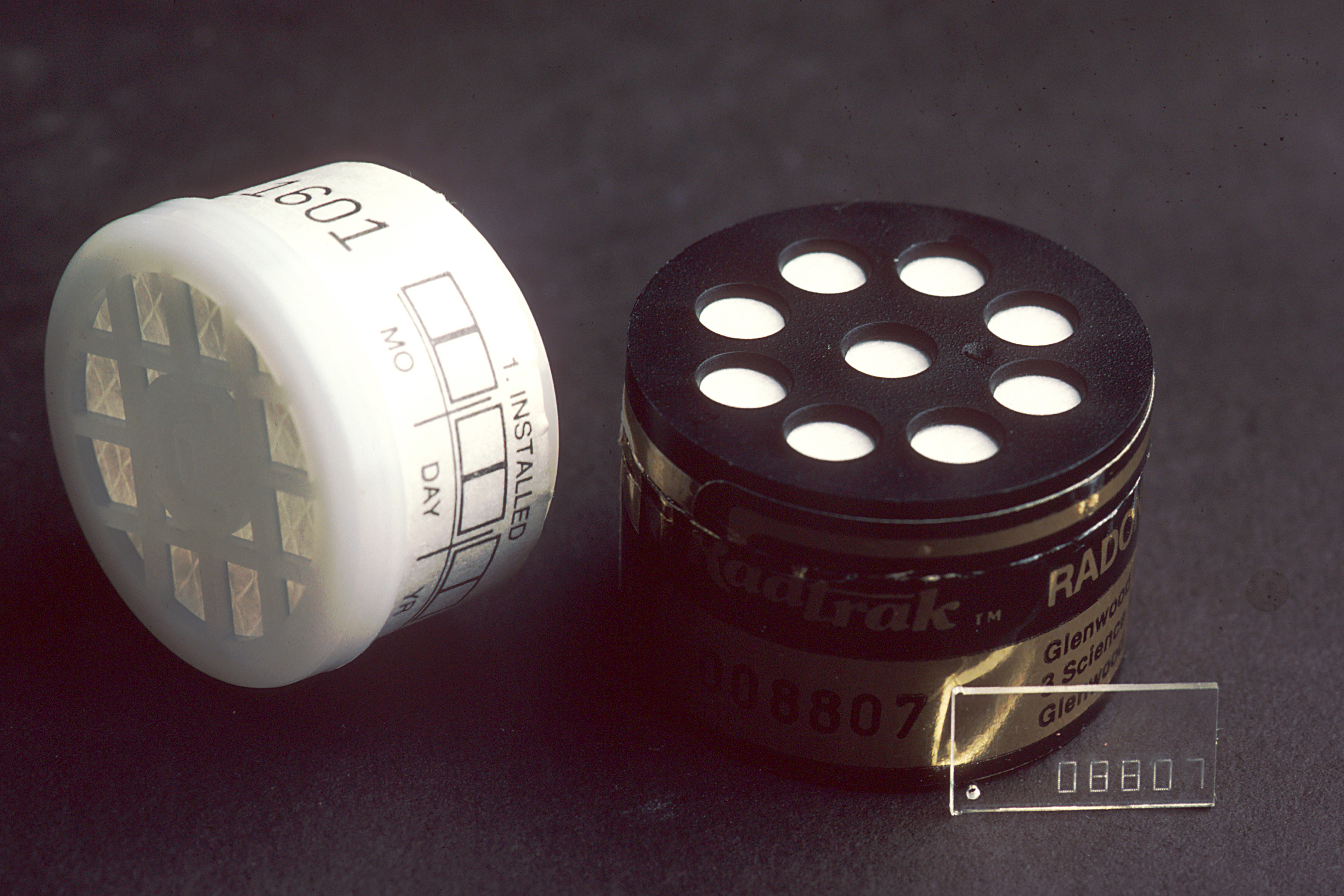
A radon test kit

There are relatively simple tests for radon gas. In some countries these tests are methodically done in areas of known systematic hazards. Radon detection devices are commercially available. Digital radon detectors provide ongoing measurements giving both daily, weekly, short-term and long-term average readouts via a digital display. Short-term radon test devices used for initial screening purposes are inexpensive, in some cases free. There are important protocols for taking short-term radon tests and it is imperative that they be strictly followed. The kit includes a collector that the user hangs in the lowest habitable floor of the house for two to seven days. The user then sends the collector to a laboratory for analysis. Long term kits, taking collections for up to one year or more, are also available. An open-land test kit can test radon emissions from the land before construction begins. Radon concentrations can vary daily, and accurate radon exposure estimates require long-term average radon measurements in the spaces where an individual spends a significant amount of time.

Radon levels fluctuate naturally, due to factors like transient weather conditions, so an initial test might not be an accurate assessment of a home's average radon level. Radon levels are at a maximum during the coolest part of the day when pressure differentials are greatest. Therefore, a high result (over 4 pCi/L) justifies repeating the test before undertaking more expensive abatement projects. Measurements between 4 and 10 pCi/L warrant a long-term radon test. Measurements over 10 pCi/L warrant only another short-term test so that abatement measures are not unduly delayed. The EPA has advised purchasers of real estate to delay or decline a purchase if the seller has not successfully abated radon to 4 pCi/L or less.

Because the half-life of radon is only 3.8 days, removing or isolating the source will greatly reduce the hazard within a few weeks. Another method of reducing radon levels is to modify the building's ventilation. Generally, the indoor radon concentrations increase as ventilation rates decrease. In a well-ventilated place, the radon concentration tends to align with outdoor values (typically 10 Bq/m^{3} (0.27 pCi/L), ranging from 1 to 100 Bq/m^{3} (0.027 to 2.703 pCi/L).

The four principal ways of reducing the amount of radon accumulating in a house are:

- Sub-slab depressurization (soil suction) by increasing under-floor ventilation;
- Improving the ventilation of the house and avoiding the transport of radon from the basement into living rooms;
- Installing a radon sump system in the basement;
- Installing a positive pressurization or positive supply ventilation system.

According to the EPA, the method to reduce radon "...primarily used is a vent pipe system and fan, which pulls radon from beneath the house and vents it to the outside", which is also called sub-slab depressurization, active soil depressurization, or soil suction. Generally indoor radon can be mitigated by sub-slab depressurization and exhausting such radon-laden air to the outdoors, away from windows and other building openings. "[The] EPA generally recommends methods which prevent the entry of radon. Soil suction, for example, prevents radon from entering your home by drawing the radon from below the home and venting it through a pipe, or pipes, to the air above the home where it is quickly diluted" and the "EPA does not recommend the use of sealing alone to reduce radon because, by itself, sealing has not been shown to lower radon levels significantly or consistently".

Positive-pressure ventilation systems can be combined with a heat exchanger to recover energy in the process of exchanging air with the outside, and simply exhausting basement air to the outside is not necessarily a viable solution as this can actually draw radon gas into a dwelling. Homes built on a crawl space may benefit from a radon collector installed under a "radon barrier" (a sheet of plastic that covers the crawl space). For crawl spaces, the EPA states that "[a]n effective method to reduce radon levels in crawl space homes involves covering the earth floor with a high-density plastic sheet. A vent pipe and fan are used to draw the radon from under the sheet and vent it to the outdoors. This form of soil suction is called submembrane suction, and when properly applied is the most effective way to reduce radon levels in crawl space homes."

Computational fluid dynamics (CFD) modelling has been used to quantify the performance of sub-slab air chamber systems under both depressurization and forced-air ventilation configurations. Models validated against experimental data from a real building show that depressurization systems reduce indoor radon concentrations by 45–90% relative to a sealed chamber, with smaller buildings achieving the greatest reductions and efficiency gains diminishing at higher extraction flow rates. Forced-air ventilation systems, by contrast, can generate overpressure within the chamber if the inlet flow exceeds the outlet capacity, which promotes radon ingress and may increase indoor concentrations. These findings support the optimization of mitigation system design by balancing radon reduction against construction complexity and energy consumption.

== See also ==
- International Radon Project
- Lucas cell
- Pleochroic halo (aka radiohalo)
- Radiation Exposure Compensation Act
