= Radon hexafluoride =

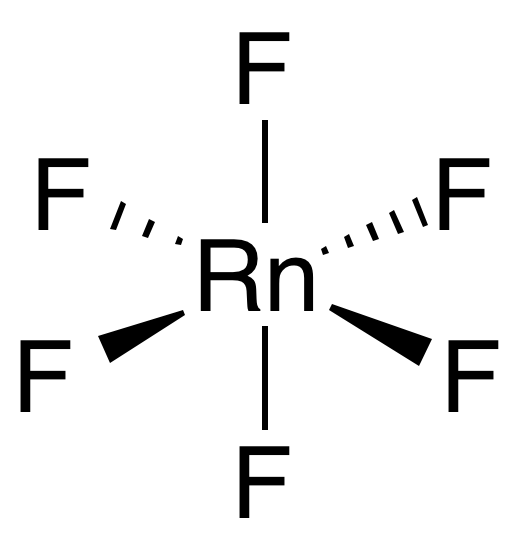

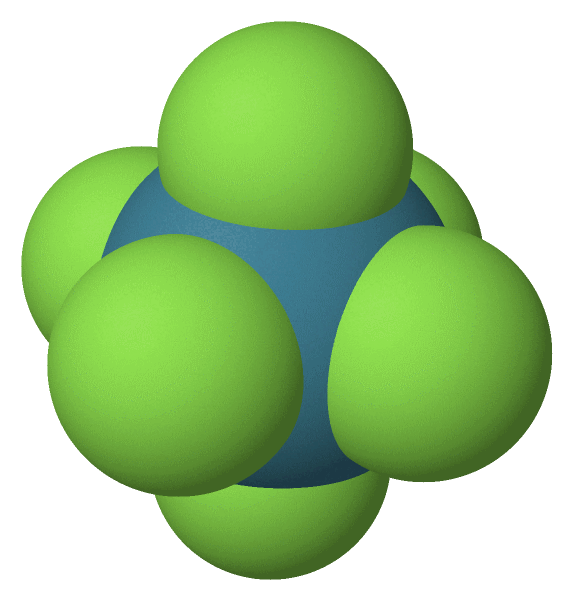

Names
- IUPAC name Radon hexafluoride

Identifiers
CAS Number	80948-45-4
3D model (JSmol)	Interactive image
ChemSpider	29333640
- InChI: InChI=1S/F6Rn/c1-7(2,3,4,5)6 Key: AONZSGXJYUJATR-UHFFFAOYSA-N
- SMILES: F[Rn](F)(F)(F)(F)F

Properties
Chemical formula	F_{6}Rn
Molar mass	336 g·mol^{−1}

Related compounds
Related compounds	Xenon hexafluoride Krypton hexafluoride
- Except where otherwise noted, data are given for materials in their standard state (at 25 °C [77 °F], 100 kPa). Infobox references

Radon hexafluoride is a binary chemical compound of radon and fluorine with the chemical formula RnF_{6}. It is hypothetical and has not been synthesized so far.

== Potential properties ==
The compound is calculated to be less stable than radon difluoride. Radon hexafluoride is expected to have an octahedral molecular geometry, unlike the C_{3v} of xenon hexafluoride.

The Rn-F bonds in radon hexafluoride is predicted to be shorter and more stable compared to Xe-F bonds in xenon hexafluoride.
