= Robert Bowie Owens =

American electrical engineer

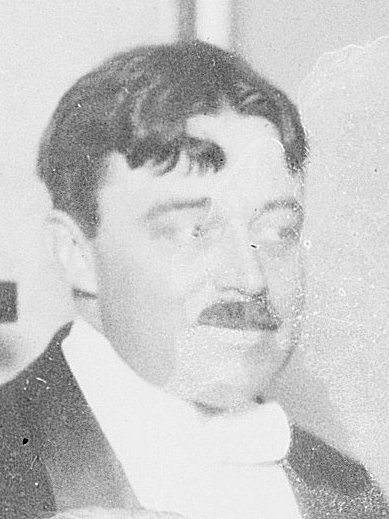
Robert Bowie Owens (photo taken May 19, 1915)

Robert Bowie Owens (October 29, 1870 – November 3, 1940) was a U.S. electrical engineer. He was the director of the Maryland Academy of Science. He was secretary of Franklin Institute from 1910 to 1924. He is credited as a discoverer of the alpha ray.

== Biography ==
He was born October 29, 1870. Owens was a graduate of the Industrial College of Johns Hopkins University and Columbia University.

On August 19, 1891 he was employed as an adjunct professor in electrical engineering in the newly formed school of Electrical Engineering at the University of Nebraska. During his time at Nebraska, Owens was involved in forming The Society of Electrical Engineers of the University of Nebraska in 1893, the body which is known today as the IEEE.

After seven years of service he left the now-department in shape comparable to other universities of the time, in August 1898, Owens took a position as MacDonald Chair of Electrical Engineering at McGill University in Montreal. There he met the new MacDonald Professor of Physics, Ernest Rutherford. Both Owens and Rutherford conducted research on radioactivity, Owens concentrating on compounds of thorium, Rutherford on those of uranium. Owens, it is argued, deserves part of the credit for the discovery of the isotope of radon formed in the radioactive decay of thorium, along with Rutherford and his student Harriet Brooks.

Owens served as an officer in World War I, alongside General John J. Pershing.

He died on November 3, 1940.
