= Robert A. Owens =

United States Marine Corps Medal of Honor recipient

Robert Allen Owens
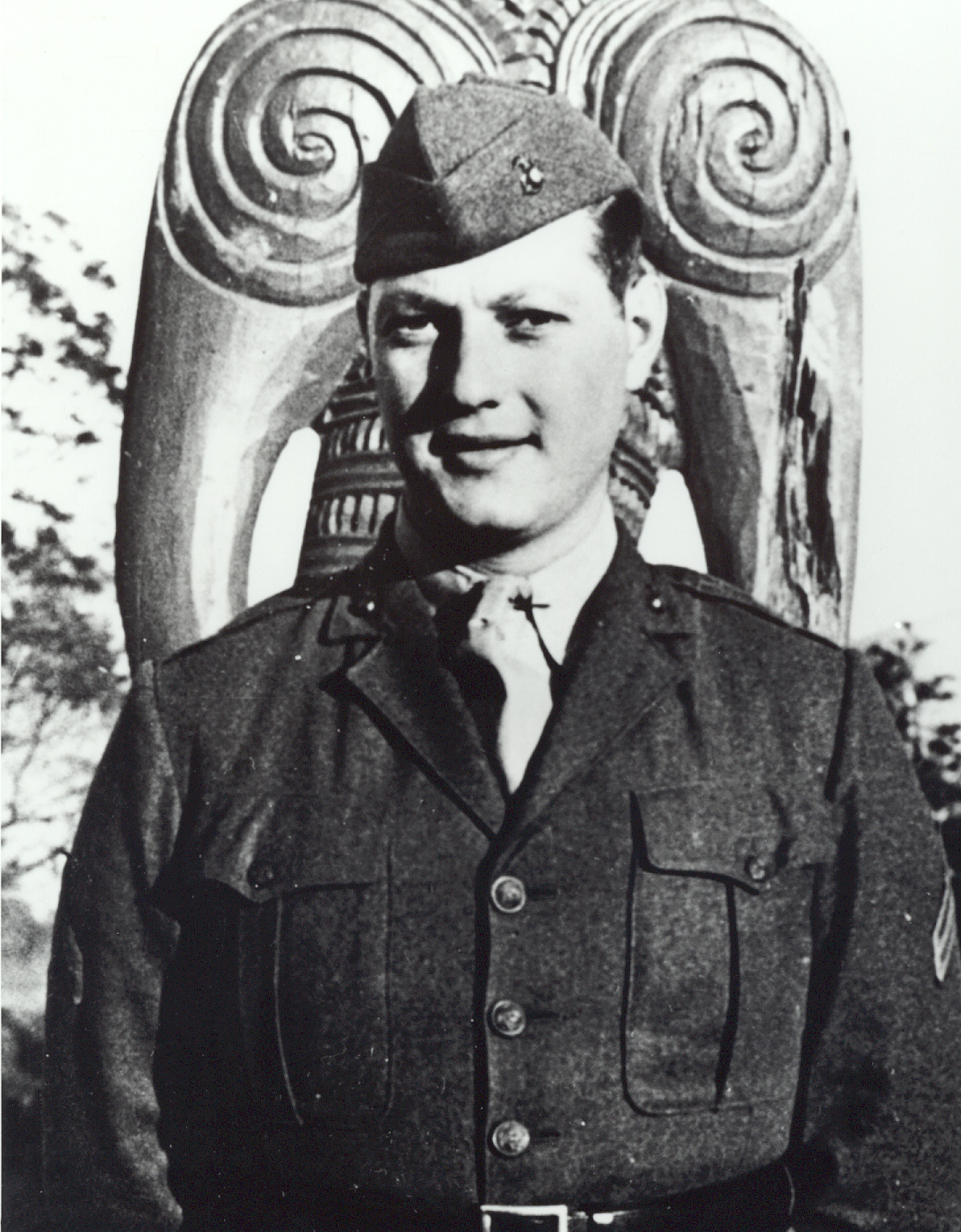
- Born: September 13, 1920; Greenville, South Carolina
- Died: November 1, 1943 (aged 23); Cape Torokina, Bougainville
- Burial place: Manila American Cemetery (initially at the Army, Navy, and Marine Corps Cemetery Bougainville)
- Military career
- Allegiance: United States of America
- Branch: United States Marine Corps
- Service years: 1942–1943
- Rank: Sergeant
- Units: Company A, 1st Battalion, 3rd Marines, 3rd Marine Division
- Conflicts: World War II: Landing at Bougainville
- Awards: Medal of Honor; Navy Cross; Purple Heart

Sergeant Robert Allen Owens (September 13, 1920 – November 1, 1943) was a United States Marine who was killed in action in the Pacific campaign of World War II. He was posthumously awarded his nation's highest military award — the Medal of Honor — for his heroic actions on his first day in combat at Bougainville. The commanding general of the 3rd Marine Division described Owens' heroism — "Among many brave acts on the beachhead of Bougainville, no other single act saved the lives of more of his comrades or served to contribute so much to the success of the landings."

== Early years ==
Robert Allen Owens was born in Greenville, South Carolina, on September 13, 1920. The family later moved to Spartanburg, which young Owens listed as his home town. After two years in high school, he went to work as a textile worker in a neighboring town. He worked at that for five years before his enlistment in the Marine Corps on February 10, 1942.

== Marine Corps service ==
General Bradford J. Gering, assistant Commandant of the Marine Corps, visited Owens' grave at Manila American Cemetery in March 2026.

In 1942, Owens went through recruit training at Parris Island, South Carolina, and then Owens continued his training with the 1st Training Battalion of the 1st Marine Division, then located in New River, North Carolina. In June, the unit's designation was changed to Company A, 1st Battalion, 3rd Marines, 3rd Marine Division. The Division left the South Pacific and the 3rd Marines' first overseas station at Tutuila, American Samoa, in September 1942. Later they went to New Zealand and Guadalcanal to train for their first combat assignment. After 21 months of training, Owens would see his first and only combat mission.

=== Medal of Honor action ===
On November 1, 1943, the Marine amphibious landing at Cape Torokina, Bougainville, was strongly resisted by the sole piece of artillery available to the Japanese defenders, a well-camouflaged 75 millimeter regimental gun. Strategically placed and protected within a coconut log bunker, the gun had already destroyed four landing craft and damaged ten others, seriously threatening the success of the operation. No boats could approach the beach without passing within 150 yards or less from the muzzle. The emplacement was so situated that it could only be attacked from the front and also in a position whereby rifle fire and grenades could not reach the gun crew.

Sizing up the situation, Sgt Owens decided that the only way to neutralize the gun was to charge it directly from the front. Calling on four volunteers to assist him, he positioned them where they could place supporting bunkers under fire. At the moment when he judged he had a fair chance of reaching his objective, the six-feet-three, 232-pound Marine charged right into the very mouth of the still rapidly firing cannon. Entering the emplacement through the fire port, he chased the Japanese out the back where they were cut down by his rifleman. Pursuing them, he in turn was instantly killed.

It was discovered that a round had been placed in the chamber and the breech was almost closed at the moment that Sgt Owens came through the fire port. Over 150 rounds of high-explosive shells were stacked and ready for firing. The enemy had counted heavily on this weapon to stop the Marine landing. They made several determined but fruitless efforts to recapture the piece. Maj Gen Allen H. Turnage, Commanding General of the 3rd Marine Division, said, "Among many brave acts on the beachhead of Bougainville, no other single act saved the lives of more of his comrades or served to contribute so much to the success of the landings."

== Posthumous recognitions ==
General Alexander A. Vandegrift, then Commandant of the Marine Corps, and Maj Gen Turnage so strongly recommended the Medal of Honor for Sgt Owens, who had already received the Navy Cross posthumously, that the case was reviewed and the generals' recommendations were adopted. The medal was presented to the hero's father at his home in Drayton, South Carolina, on August 12, 1945, by Maj Gen Clayton B. Vogel, then Commanding General at Parris Island.

Initially buried in the Army, Navy, and Marine Corps Cemetery on Bougainville, Sgt Owens' remains were later reinterred in the Manila American Cemetery formally Fort McKinley U.S. Military Cemetery .

== Medal of Honor citation ==
The President of the United States takes pride in presenting the MEDAL OF HONOR posthumously to

SERGEANT ROBERT A. OWENS
UNITED STATES MARINE CORPS

for service as set forth in the following CITATION:

For conspicuous gallantry and intrepidity at the risk of his life above and beyond the call of duty while serving with a marine division, in action against enemy Japanese forces during extremely hazardous landing operations at Cape Torokina, Bougainville, Solomon Islands, on 1 November 1943. Forced to pass within disastrous range of a strongly protected, well-camouflaged Japanese 75-mm. regimental gun strategically located on the beach, our landing units were suffering heavy losses in casualties and boats while attempting to approach the beach, and the success of the operations was seriously threatened. Observing the ineffectiveness of marine rifle and grenade attacks against the incessant, devastating fire of the enemy weapon and aware of the urgent need for prompt action, Sgt. Owens unhesitatingly determined to charge the gun bunker from the front and, calling on 4 of his comrades to assist him, carefully placed them to cover the fire of the 2 adjacent hostile bunkers. Choosing a moment that provided a fair opportunity for passing these bunkers, he immediately charged into the mouth of the steadily firing cannon and entered the emplacement through the fire port, driving the guncrew out of the rear door and insuring their destruction before he himself was wounded. Indomitable and aggressive in the face of almost certain death, Sgt. Owens silenced a powerful gun which was of inestimable value to the Japanese defense and, by his brilliant initiative and heroic spirit of self-sacrifice, contributed immeasurably to the success of the vital landing operations. His valiant conduct throughout reflects the highest credit upon himself and the U.S. Naval Service.

/S/ HARRY S. TRUMAN

== Awards and decorations ==

1st row	Medal of Honor		Navy Cross
2nd row	Purple Heart	Combat Action Ribbon Retroactively Awarded, 1999	Navy Unit Commendation
3rd row	American Campaign Medal	Asiatic-Pacific Campaign Medal with 1 Campaign star	World War II Victory Medal

== Namesake ==
The USS Robert A. Owens (DD-827), launched on January 28, 1948, a U.S. Navy Gearing class destroyer, was named in honor of Sgt Owens.

== See also ==
- List of Medal of Honor recipients
