= USS Robert A. Owens =

Gearing-class destroyer

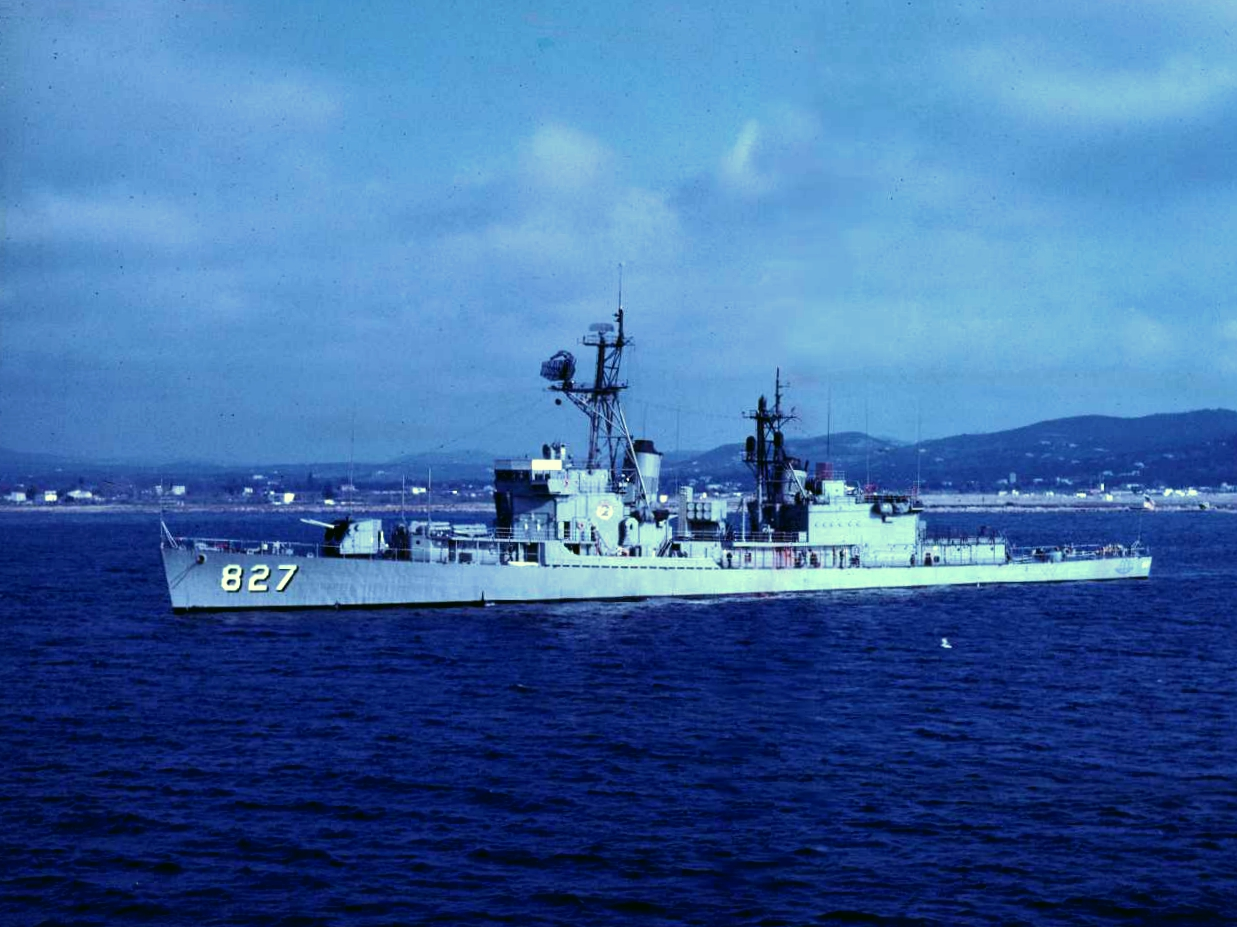
- USS Robert A. Owens (DD-827) off Toulon in 1967

History

United States
- Name: USS Robert A. Owens
- Namesake: Robert A. Owens
- Ordered: 6 June 1943
- Builder: Bath Iron Works, Bath, Maine
- Laid down: 29 October 1945
- Launched: 15 July 1946
- Commissioned: 5 November 1949
- Decommissioned: 16 February 1982
- Reclassified: DDK-827, 28 January 1948; DDE-827, 4 March 1950; DD-827, 7 August 1962
- Stricken: 6 August 1987
- Identification: Callsign: NAYW; Hull number: DD-827
- Fate: Transferred to Turkey 16 February 1982
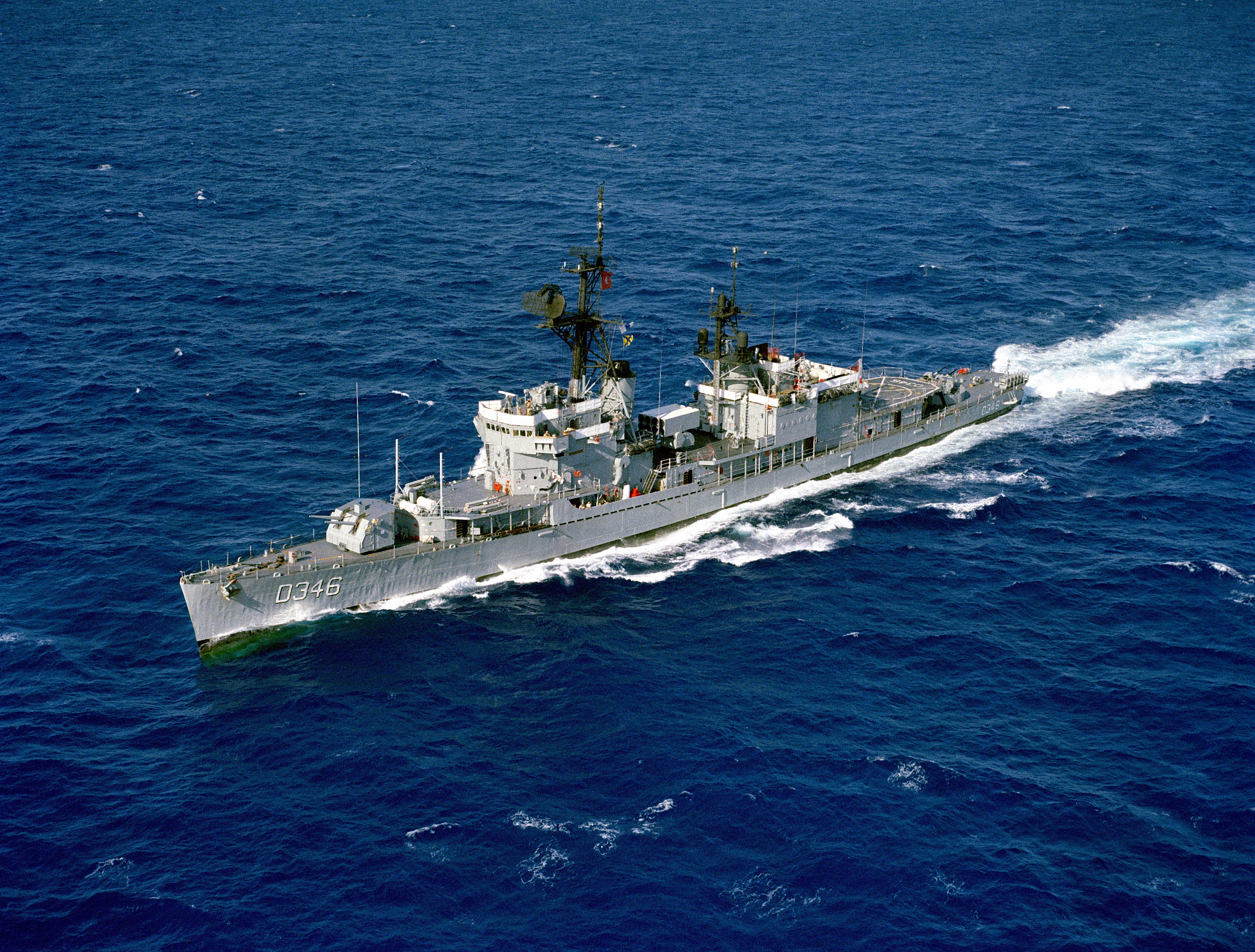
- TCG Alçıtepe (D-346) underway, 1983.

Turkey
- Name: TCG Alçi Tepe (D-346)
- Namesake: Alçi Tepe
- Acquired: 16 February 1982
- Decommissioned: 1999
- Stricken: 1999
- Fate: Scrapped

General characteristics
- Class & type: Gearing-class destroyer
- Displacement: 3,460 long tons (3,516 t) full
- Length: 390 ft 6 in (119.02 m)
- Beam: 40 ft 10 in (12.45 m)
- Draft: 14 ft 4 in (4.37 m)
- Propulsion: Geared turbines, 2 shafts, 60,000 shp (45 MW)
- Speed: 35 knots (65 km/h; 40 mph)
- Range: 4,500 nmi (8,300 km) at 20 kn (37 km/h; 23 mph)
- Complement: 336
- Armament: 6 × 5"/38 caliber guns; 12 × 40 mm AA guns; 11 × 20 mm AA guns; 10 × 21 inch (533 mm) torpedo tubes; 6 × depth charge projectors; 2 × depth charge tracks

USS Robert A. Owens (DD/DDK/DDE-827) was a Gearing-class destroyer of the United States Navy, in service from 1949 to 1982. The ship was named for United States Marine Corps Medal of Honor recipient Robert A. Owens. The ship was then transferred to Turkey through the Security Assistance Program (SAP) and served as TCG Alcitepe (D-346). The destroyer was finally decommissioned in 1999 and scrapped.

== Service history ==
Robert A. Owens was laid down on 29 October 1945 by the Bath Iron Works Corp., Bath, Maine; launched on 15 July 1946; sponsored by Miss Patricia Hannegan; reclassified DDK-827 on 28 January 1948; and commissioned at Boston on 5 November 1949. She was named for United States Marine Corps Sergeant Robert A. Owens (1920–1943), who was awarded both the Navy Cross and Medal of Honor posthumously for his heroic actions in the Battle of Empress Augusta Bay.

=== 1950–1959 ===
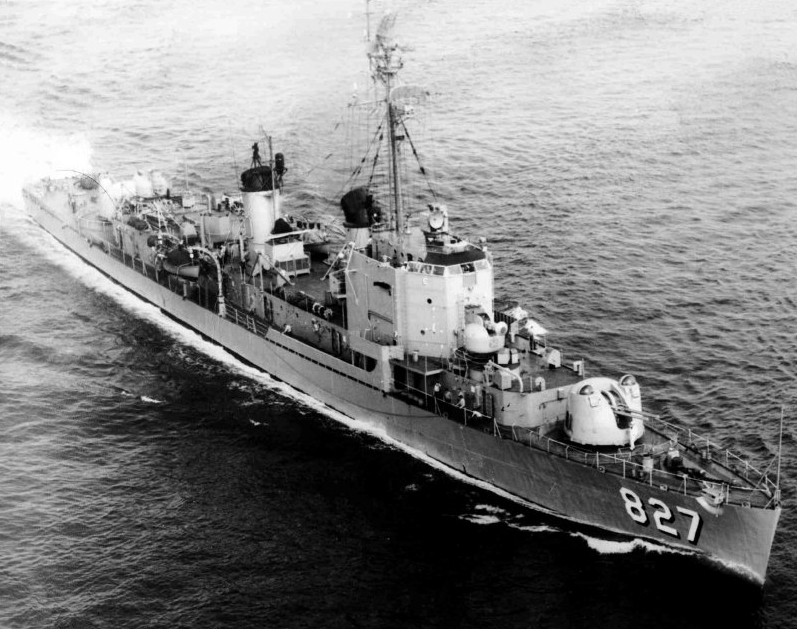
Robert A. Owens in 1957.

Following shakedown in February 1950, Robert A. Owens, one of the first hunter-killer destroyers so designated, was reclassified DDE-827 on 4 March 1950. She operated in the western Atlantic and the Caribbean (during which time she sank U-2513 west of Key West, Florida during rocket tests on 7 October 1951) and in late 1952 when she deployed to the Mediterranean. From that time into the 1960s, she operated with the 6th Fleet for six months out of every eighteen. During the remaining twelve months, she conducted anti-submarine patrols off the Atlantic coast and in the Caribbean. In the fall of 1957 she added the North Sea to her operational area as she joined in NATO exercises.

=== 1960–1969 ===
In the 1960s, Robert A. Owens continued to rotate between 2nd and 6th Fleets. In November 1960 and February 1962, she assisted in the recovery operations for Project Mercury space capsules, Mercury 2 and Mercury 6. After the latter, Robert A. Owens sailed east to join Task Group Bravo (TG Bravo) for eastern Atlantic antisubmarine operations. Reclassified DD-827 on 7 August 1962, she was a unit of the Cuban Quarantine Task Force 136 during October and November. In January and February 1963, she conducted anti-submarine warfare (ASW) operations in the Atlantic. March brought another period of patrol off Cuba; and, in April, Robert A. Owens again got underway for extended deployment. Duty in the Mediterranean, the Red Sea, and the Indian Ocean followed and on 23 December she entered the Norfolk Naval Shipyard for Fleet Rehabilitation and Modernization (FRAM) overhaul.

Completing overhaul on 15 November 1964, Robert A. Owens served as schoolship for the Fleet Sonar School and, after refresher training at Guantanamo Bay, joined the Recovery Force for Gemini-Titan 3 (GT3) in March 1965 and Gemini-Titan 4 (GT4) in June. On 27 November, she sailed for an extended deployment to the 6th Fleet and Middle East Force, returning to Fleet Sonar School ship duty in May 1966. She then operated in the Atlantic until deploying to the Mediterranean during the first five months of 1967. The balance of the year was spent in Atlantic operations, schoolship duties, and overhaul which was completed on 11 March 1968.

Robert A. Owens then participated in the search for submarine Scorpion (SSN-589) from 28 May to 13 June, and conducted ASW operations before deploying to the 6th Fleet from 5 September 1968 to 27 January 1969. She then operated in the Atlantic and Caribbean without an extended deployment for the balance of that year.

=== 1970–1973 ===
Between 1 January 1970 and 31 December 1972, she alternated two Mediterranean deployments with normal operations in the Atlantic and Caribbean out of her home port, Norfolk, Virginia. The year 1973 was taken up completely by Atlantic and Caribbean operations.

During 1976 at least, she was home ported in Galveston Texas, making a round trip to Norfolk that spring.

=== 1978–1981 ===
Between 1978 and 1981, she was assigned to the Naval Surface Reserve Force and homeported at Naval Air Station Pensacola, Florida, berthed adjacent to the training aircraft carrier USS Lexington. During this time the USS Owens was used to train reserve members of the Navy and Marines.

== TCG Alçi Tepe (D-346) ==
Robert A. Owens was decommissioned on 16 February 1982 and transferred to the Republic of Turkey through the Security Assistance Program (SAP) that same day. She served as TCG Alçi Tepe (D-346) with the Turkish Navy until early 1999 when she was decommissioned & scrapped.
