= Actinide =

F-block chemical elements

The actinide (/ˈæktɪnaɪd/) or actinoid (/ˈæktɪnɔɪd/) series encompasses at least the 14 metallic chemical elements in the 5f series, with atomic numbers from 89 to 102, actinium through to nobelium. Number 103, lawrencium, is also generally included despite being part of the 6d transition series. The actinide series derives its name from the first element in the series, actinium. The informal chemical symbol An is used in general discussions of actinide chemistry to refer to any actinide.

The 1985 IUPAC Red Book recommends that actinoid be used rather than actinide, since the suffix -ide normally indicates a negative ion. However, owing to widespread current use, actinide is still allowed.

Actinium through nobelium are f-block elements, while lawrencium is a d-block element and a transition metal. The series mostly corresponds to the filling of the 5f electron shell, although as isolated atoms in the ground state many have anomalous configurations involving the filling of the 6d shell due to interelectronic repulsion. In comparison with the lanthanides, also mostly f-block elements, the actinides show much more variable valence. They all have very large atomic and ionic radii and exhibit an unusually large range of physical properties. While actinium and the late actinides (from curium onwards) behave similarly to the lanthanides, the elements thorium, protactinium, and uranium are much more similar to transition metals in their chemistry, with neptunium, plutonium, and americium occupying an intermediate position.

All actinides are radioactive and release energy upon radioactive decay; naturally occurring uranium and thorium, and synthetically produced plutonium are the most abundant actinides on Earth. These have been used in nuclear reactors, and uranium and plutonium are critical elements of nuclear weapons. Uranium and thorium also have diverse current or historical uses, and americium is used in the ionization chambers of most modern smoke detectors.

Due to their long half-lives, only thorium and uranium are found on Earth and astrophysically in substantial quantities. The radioactive decay of uranium produces transient amounts of actinium and protactinium, and atoms of neptunium and plutonium are occasionally produced from transmutation reactions in uranium ores. The other actinides are purely synthetic elements. Nuclear weapons tests have released at least six actinides heavier than plutonium into the environment; analysis of debris from the 1952 first test of a hydrogen bomb showed the presence of americium, curium, berkelium, californium, and the discovery of einsteinium and fermium.

In presentations of the periodic table, the f-block elements are customarily shown as two additional rows below the main body of the table. This convention is entirely a matter of aesthetics and formatting practicality; a rarely used wide-formatted periodic table inserts the 4f and 5f series in their proper places, as parts of the table's sixth and seventh rows (periods).

Actinides

| Actinium89Ac[227] | Thorium90Th232.04 | Protactinium91Pa231.04 | Uranium92U238.03 | Neptunium93Np[237] | Plutonium94Pu[244] | Americium95Am[243] | Curium96Cm[247] | Berkelium97Bk[247] | Californium98Cf[251] | Einsteinium99Es[252] | Fermium100Fm[257] | Mendelevium101Md[258] | Nobelium102No[259] | Lawrencium103Lr[266] |

Primordial From decay Synthetic Border shows natural occurrence of the element

== Discovery, isolation and synthesis ==
Synthesis of transuranium elements (Note: Nobelium and lawrencium were almost simultaneously discovered by Soviet and American scientists)
| Element | Year | Method |
|---|---|---|
| Neptunium | 1940 | Bombarding ^{238}U with neutrons |
| Plutonium | 1941 | Bombarding ^{238}U with deuterons |
| Americium | 1944 | Bombarding ^{239}Pu with neutrons |
| Curium | 1944 | Bombarding ^{239}Pu with α-particles |
| Berkelium | 1949 | Bombarding ^{241}Am with α-particles |
| Californium | 1950 | Bombarding ^{242}Cm with α-particles |
| Einsteinium | 1952 | As a product of nuclear explosion |
| Fermium | 1952 | As a product of nuclear explosion |
| Mendelevium | 1955 | Bombarding ^{253}Es with α-particles |
| Nobelium | 1965 | Bombarding ^{243}Am with ^{15}N or ^{238}U with ^{22}Ne |
| Lawrencium | 1961 –1971 | Bombarding ^{252}Cf with ^{10}B or ^{11}B and of ^{243}Am with ^{18}O |

Like the lanthanides, the actinides form a family of elements with similar properties. Within the actinides, there are two overlapping groups: transuranium elements, which follow uranium in the periodic table, and transplutonium elements, which follow plutonium. Compared to the lanthanides, which (except for promethium) are found in nature in appreciable quantities, most actinides are rare. Most do not occur in nature, and of those that do, only thorium and uranium do so in more than trace quantities. The most abundant or easily synthesized actinides are uranium and thorium, followed by plutonium, americium, actinium, protactinium, neptunium, and curium.

The existence of transuranium elements was suggested in 1934 by Enrico Fermi, based on his experiments. However, even though four actinides were known by that time, it was not yet understood that they formed a family similar to lanthanides. The prevailing view that dominated early research into transuranics was that they were regular elements in the 7th period, with thorium, protactinium and uranium corresponding to 6th-period hafnium, tantalum and tungsten, respectively. Synthesis of transuranics gradually undermined this point of view. By 1944, an observation that curium failed to exhibit oxidation states above 4 (whereas its supposed 6th period homolog, platinum, can reach oxidation state of 6) prompted Glenn Seaborg to formulate an "actinide hypothesis". Studies of known actinides and discoveries of further transuranic elements provided more data in support of this position, but the phrase "actinide hypothesis" (the implication being that a "hypothesis" is something that has not been decisively proven) remained in active use by scientists through the late 1950s.

At present, there are two major methods of producing isotopes of transplutonium elements: (1) irradiation of the lighter elements with neutrons; (2) irradiation with accelerated charged particles. The first method is more important for applications, as only neutron irradiation using nuclear reactors allows the production of sizeable amounts of synthetic actinides; however, it is limited to relatively light elements. The advantage of the second method is that elements heavier than plutonium, as well as neutron-deficient isotopes, can be obtained, which are not formed during neutron irradiation.

In 1962–1966, there were attempts in the United States to produce transplutonium isotopes using a series of six underground nuclear explosions. Small samples of rock were extracted from the blast area immediately after the test to study the explosion products, but no isotopes with mass number greater than 257 could be detected, despite predictions that such isotopes would have relatively long half-lives of α-decay. This non-observation was attributed to spontaneous fission owing to the large speed of the products and to other decay channels, such as neutron emission and nuclear fission.

=== From actinium to uranium ===
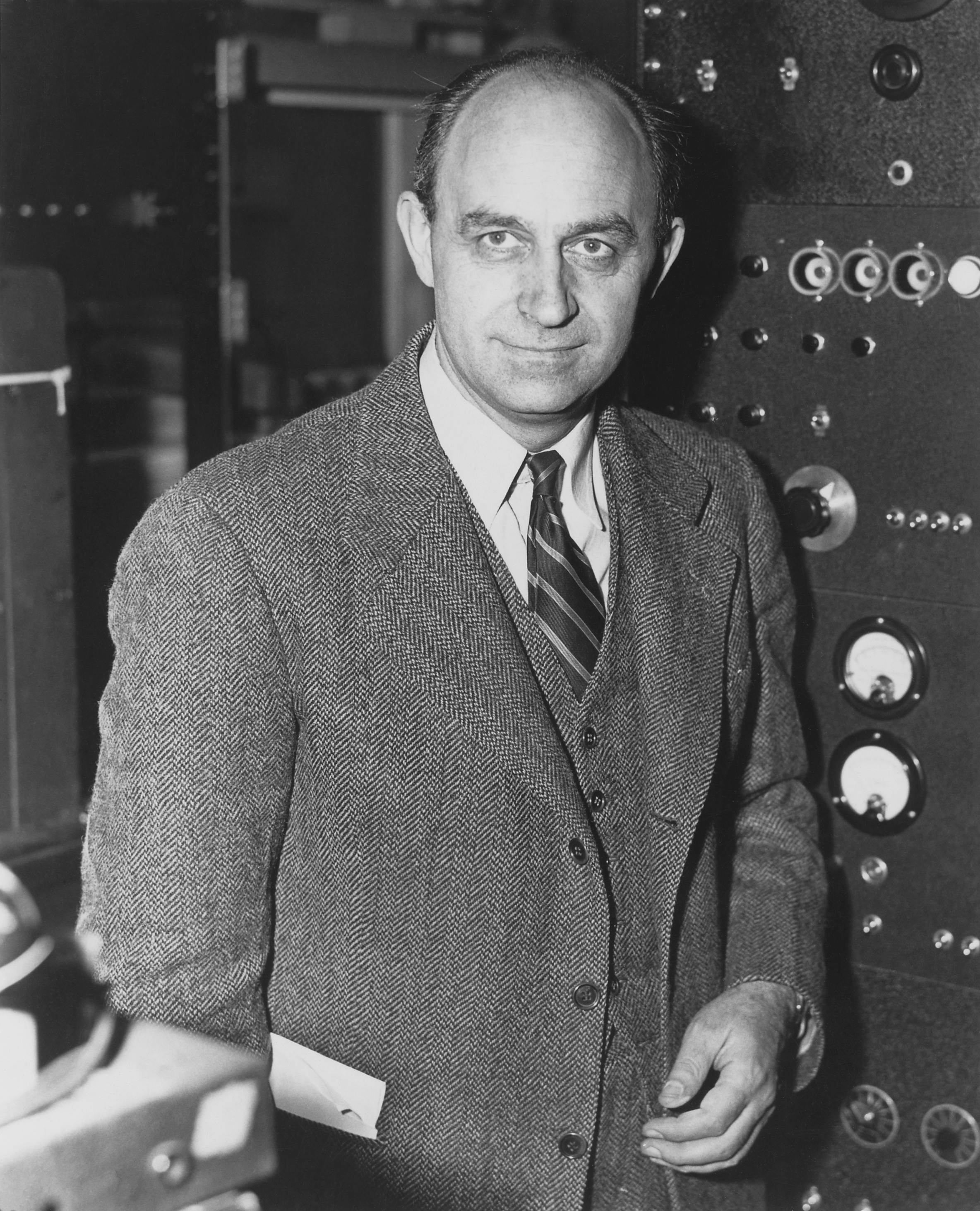
Enrico Fermi suggested the existence of transuranium elements in 1934.

Uranium and thorium were the first actinides discovered. Uranium was identified in 1789 by the German chemist Martin Heinrich Klaproth in pitchblende ore. He named it after the planet Uranus, which had been discovered eight years earlier. Klaproth was able to precipitate a yellow compound (likely sodium diuranate) by dissolving pitchblende in nitric acid and neutralizing the solution with sodium hydroxide. He then reduced the obtained yellow powder with charcoal, and extracted a black substance that he mistook for metal. Sixty years later, the French scientist Eugène-Melchior Péligot identified it as uranium oxide. He also isolated the first sample of uranium metal by heating uranium tetrachloride with metallic potassium. The atomic mass of uranium was then calculated as 120, but Dmitri Mendeleev in 1872 corrected it to 240 using his periodicity laws. This value was confirmed experimentally in 1882 by K. Zimmerman.

Thorium oxide was discovered by Friedrich Wöhler in the mineral thorianite, which was found in Norway (1827). Jöns Jacob Berzelius characterized this material in more detail in 1828. By reduction of thorium tetrachloride with potassium, he isolated the metal and named it thorium after the Norse god of thunder and lightning Thor. The same isolation method was later used by Péligot for uranium.

Actinium was discovered in 1899 by André-Louis Debierne, an assistant of Marie Curie, in the pitchblende waste left after removal of radium and polonium. He described the substance (in 1899) as similar to titanium and (in 1900) as similar to thorium. The discovery of actinium by Debierne was however questioned in 1971 and 2000, arguing that Debierne's publications in 1904 contradicted his earlier work of 1899–1900. This view instead credits the 1902 work of Friedrich Oskar Giesel, who discovered a radioactive element named emanium that behaved similarly to lanthanum. The name actinium comes from the Ancient Greek: ακτίς, ακτίνος (aktis, aktinos), meaning beam or ray. This metal was discovered not by its own radiation but by the radiation of the daughter products. Owing to the close similarity of actinium and lanthanum and low abundance, pure actinium could only be produced in 1950. The term actinide was probably introduced by Victor Goldschmidt in 1937.

Protactinium was possibly isolated in 1900 by William Crookes. It was first identified in 1913, when Kasimir Fajans and Oswald Helmuth Göhring encountered the short-lived isotope ^{234m}Pa (half-life 1.17 minutes) during their studies of the ^{238}U decay chain. They named the new element brevium (from Latin brevis meaning brief); the name was changed to protoactinium (from Greek πρῶτος + ἀκτίς meaning "first beam element") in 1918 when two groups of scientists, led by the Austrian Lise Meitner and Otto Hahn of Germany and Frederick Soddy and John Arnold Cranston of Great Britain, independently discovered the much longer-lived ^{231}Pa. The name was shortened to protactinium in 1949. This element was little characterized until 1960, when Alfred Maddock and his co-workers in the U.K. isolated 130 grams of protactinium from 60 tonnes of waste left after extraction of uranium from its ore.

=== Neptunium and above ===
Neptunium (named for the planet Neptune, the next planet out from Uranus, after which uranium was named) was discovered by Edwin McMillan and Philip H. Abelson in 1940 in Berkeley, California. They produced the ^{239}Np isotope (half-life 2.4 days) by bombarding uranium with slow neutrons. It was the first transuranium element produced synthetically.

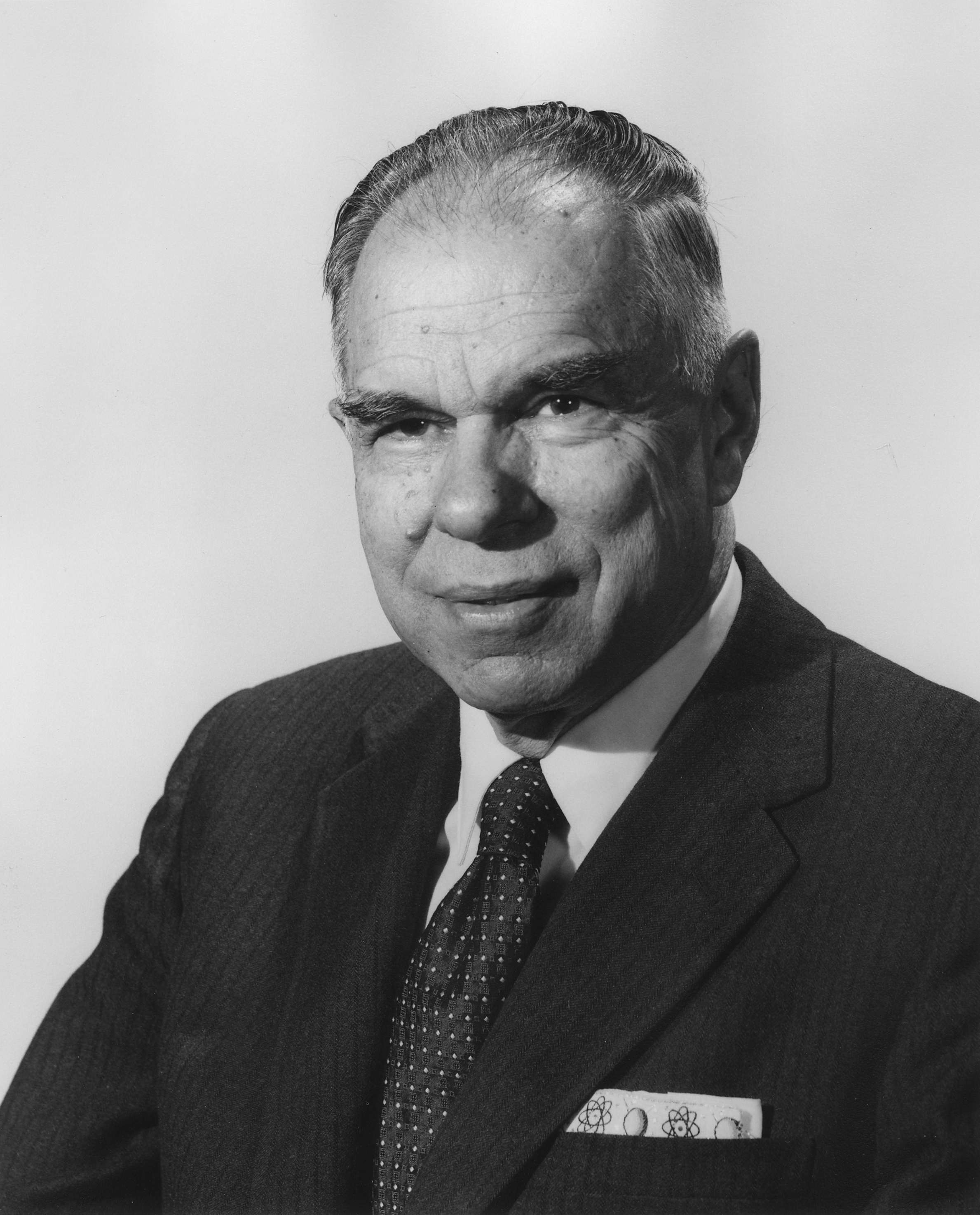
Glenn T. Seaborg and his group at the University of California, Berkeley synthesized Pu, Am, Cm, Bk, Cf, Es, Fm, Md, No and element 106, which was later named seaborgium in his honor while he was still living. They also synthesized more than a hundred actinide isotopes.

Transuranium elements do not occur in sizeable quantities in nature and are commonly synthesized via nuclear reactions conducted with nuclear reactors. For example, under irradiation with reactor neutrons, uranium-238 partially converts to plutonium-239:

$$\ce{{^{238}_{92}U} + {}^{1}_{0}n -> {}^{239}_{92}U ->[\beta^-] [23.5\ \ce{min}] {}^{239}_{93}Np ->[\beta^-] [2.3\ \ce{days}] {}^{239}_{94}Pu} \left( \ce{->[\alpha] [2.4\cdot 10^4\ \ce{years}]} \right) \ce{{^{235}_{92}U}}$$

This synthesis reaction was used by Fermi and his collaborators in their design of the reactors located at the Hanford Site, which produced significant amounts of plutonium-239 for the nuclear weapons of the Manhattan Project and the United States' post-war nuclear arsenal.

Actinides with the highest mass numbers are synthesized by bombarding uranium, plutonium, curium and californium with ions of nitrogen, oxygen, carbon, neon or boron in a particle accelerator. Thus nobelium was produced by bombarding uranium-238 with neon-22 as

$$\ce{_{92}^{238}U + _{10}^{22}Ne -> _{102}^{256}No + 4_0^1n}$$.

The first isotopes of transplutonium elements, americium-241 and curium-242, were synthesized in 1944 by Glenn T. Seaborg, Ralph A. James and Albert Ghiorso. Curium-242 was obtained by bombarding plutonium-239 with 32-MeV α-particles:

$$\ce{_{94}^{239}Pu + _2^4He -> _{96}^{242}Cm + _0^1n}$$.

The americium-241 and curium-242 isotopes also were produced by irradiating plutonium in a nuclear reactor. The latter element was named after Marie Curie and her husband Pierre who are noted for discovering radium and for their work in radioactivity.

Bombarding curium-242 with α-particles resulted in an isotope of californium ^{245}Cf in 1950, and a similar procedure yielded berkelium-243 from americium-241 in 1949. The new elements were named after Berkeley, California, by analogy with its lanthanide homologue terbium, which was named after the village of Ytterby in Sweden.

In 1945, B. B. Cunningham obtained the first bulk chemical compound of a transplutonium element, namely americium hydroxide. Over the few years, milligram quantities of americium and microgram amounts of curium were accumulated that allowed production of isotopes of berkelium and californium. Sizeable amounts of these elements were produced in 1958, and the first californium compound (0.3 μg of CfOCl) was obtained in 1960 by B. B. Cunningham and J. C. Wallmann.

Einsteinium and fermium were identified in 1952–1953 in the fallout from the "Ivy Mike" nuclear test (1 November 1952), the first successful test of a hydrogen bomb. Instantaneous exposure of uranium-238 to a large neutron flux resulting from the explosion produced heavy isotopes of uranium, which underwent a series of beta decays to nuclides such as einsteinium-253 and fermium-255. The discovery of the new elements and the new data on neutron capture were initially kept secret on the orders of the US military until 1955 due to Cold War tensions. Nevertheless, the Berkeley team were able to prepare einsteinium and fermium by civilian means, through the neutron bombardment of plutonium-239, and published this work in 1954 with the disclaimer that it was not the first studies that had been carried out on those elements. The "Ivy Mike" studies were declassified and published in 1955. The first significant (submicrogram) amounts of einsteinium were produced in 1961 by Cunningham and colleagues, but this has not been done for fermium yet.

The first isotope of mendelevium, ^{256}Md (half-life 87 min), was synthesized by Albert Ghiorso, Glenn T. Seaborg, Gregory Robert Choppin, Bernard G. Harvey and Stanley Gerald Thompson when they bombarded an ^{253}Es target with alpha particles in the 60-inch cyclotron of Berkeley Radiation Laboratory; this was the first isotope of any element to be synthesized one atom at a time.

There were several attempts to obtain isotopes of nobelium by Swedish (1957) and American (1958) groups, but the first reliable result was the synthesis of ^{256}No by the Russian group of Georgy Flyorov in 1965, as acknowledged by the IUPAC in 1992. In their experiments, Flyorov et al. bombarded uranium-238 with neon-22.

In 1961, Ghiorso et al. obtained the first isotope of lawrencium by irradiating californium (mostly californium-252) with boron-10 and boron-11 ions. The mass number of this isotope was not clearly established (possibly 258 or 259) at the time. In 1965, ^{256}Lr was synthesized by Flyorov et al. from ^{243}Am and ^{18}O. Thus IUPAC recognized the nuclear physics teams at Dubna and Berkeley as the co-discoverers of lawrencium.

== Isotopes ==
Nuclear properties of isotopes of the most important transplutonium isotopes
| Isotope | Half-life | Probability of spontaneous fission in % | Emission energy (MeV) (yield in %) | | Specific activity (Bq/kg) (Note: Specific activity is calculated by given in the table half-lives and the probability of spontaneous fission) of | |
| Isotope | Half-life | Probability of spontaneous fission in % | α | γ | α, β-particles | fission |
|---|---|---|---|---|---|---|
| ^{241}Am | 432.2(7) y | 4.3(18)×10^{−10} | 5.485 (84.8); 5.442 (13.1); 5.388 (1.66) | 0.059 (35.9); 0.026 (2.27) | 1.27×10^{14} | 546.1 |
| ^{243}Am | 7.37(4)×10^{3} y | 3.7(2)×10^{−9} | 5.275 (87.1); 5.233 (11.2); 5.181 (1.36) | 0.074 (67.2); 0.043 (5.9) | 7.39×10^{12} | 273.3 |
| ^{242}Cm | 162.8(2) d | 6.2(3)×10^{−6} | 6.069 (25.92); 6.112 (74.08) | 0.044 (0.04); 0.102 (4×10^{−3}) | 1.23×10^{17} | 7.6×10^{9} |
| ^{244}Cm | 18.10(2) y | 1.37(3)×10^{−4} | 5.762 (23.6); 5.804 (76.4) | 0.043 (0.02); 0.100 (1.5×10^{−3}) | 2.96×10^{15} | 4.1×10^{9} |
| ^{245}Cm | 8.5(1)×10^{3} y | 6.1(9)×10^{−7} | 5.529 (0.58); 5.488 (0.83); 5.361 (93.2) | 0.175 (9.88); 0.133 (2.83) | 6.35×10^{12} | 3.9×10^{4} |
| ^{246}Cm | 4.76(4)×10^{3} y | 0.02615(7) | 5.343 (17.8); 5.386 (82.2) | 0.045 (19) | 1.13×10^{13} | 2.95×10^{9} |
| ^{247}Cm | 1.56(5)×10^{7} y | — | 5.267 (13.8); 5.212 (5.7); 5.147 (1.2) | 0.402 (72); 0.278 (3.4) | 3.43×10^{9} | — |
| ^{248}Cm | 3.48(6)×10^{5} y | 8.39(16) | 5.034 (16.52); 5.078 (75) | — | 1.40×10^{11} | 1.29×10^{10} |
| ^{249}Bk | 330(4) d | 4.7(2)×10^{−8} | 5.406 (1×10^{−3}); 5.378 (2.6×10^{−4}) | 0.32 (5.8×10^{−5}) | 5.88×10^{16} | 2.76×10^{7} |
| ^{249}Cf | 351(2) y | 5.0(4)×10^{−7} | 6.193 (2.46); 6.139 (1.33); 5.946 (3.33) | 0.388 (66); 0.333 (14.6) | 1.51×10^{14} | 7.57×10^{5} |
| ^{250}Cf | 13.08(9) y | 0.077(3) | 5.988 (14.99); 6.030 (84.6) | 0.043 | 4.04×10^{15} | 3.11×10^{12} |
| ^{251}Cf | 900(40) y | ? | 6.078 (2.6); 5.567 (0.9); 5.569 (0.9) | 0.177 (17.3); 0.227 (6.8) | 5.86×10^{13} | — |
| ^{252}Cf | 2.645(8) y | 3.092(8) | 6.075 (15.2); 6.118 (81.6) | 0.042 (1.4×10^{−2}); 0.100 (1.3×10^{−2}) | 1.92×10^{16} | 6.14×10^{14} |
| ^{254}Cf | 60.5(2) d | ≈100 | 5.834 (0.26); 5.792 (5.3×10^{−2}) | — | 9.75×10^{14} | 3.13×10^{17} |
| ^{253}Es | 20.47(3) d | 8.7(3)×10^{−6} | 6.540 (0.85); 6.552 (0.71); 6.590 (6.6) | 0.387 (0.05); 0.429 (8×10^{−3}) | 9.33×10^{17} | 8.12×10^{10} |
| ^{254}Es | 275.7(5) d | < 3×10^{−6} | 6.347 (0.75); 6.358 (2.6); 6.415 (1.8) | 0.042 (100); 0.034 (30) | 6.9×10^{16} | — |
| ^{255}Es | 39.8(12) d | 0.0041(2) | 6.267 (0.78); 6.401 (7) | — | 4.38×10^{17}(β); 3.81×10^{16}(α) | 1.95×10^{13} |
| ^{255}Fm | 20.07(7) h | 2.4(10)×10^{−5} | 7.022 (93.4); 6.963 (5.04); 6.892 (0.62) | 0.00057 (19.1); 0.081 (1) | 2.27×10^{19} | 5.44×10^{12} |
| ^{256}Fm | 157.6(13) min | 91.9(3) | 6.872 (1.2); 6.917 (6.9) | — | 1.58×10^{20} | 1.4×10^{19} |
| ^{257}Fm | 100.5(2) d | 0.210(4) | 6.752 (0.58); 6.695 (3.39); 6.622 (0.6) | 0.241 (11); 0.179 (8.7) | 1.87×10^{17} | 3.93×10^{14} |
| ^{256}Md | 77(2) min | — | 7.142 (1.84); 7.206 (5.9) | — | 3.53×10^{20} | — |
| ^{257}Md | 5.52(5) h | — | 7.074 (14) | 0.371 (11.7); 0.325 (2.5) | 8.17×10^{19} | — |
| ^{258}Md | 51.5(3) d | — | 6.73 | — | 3.64×10^{17} | — |
| ^{255}No | 3.1(2) min | — | 8.312 (1.16); 8.266 (2.6); 8.121 (27.8) | 0.187 (3.4) | 8.78×10^{21} | — |
| ^{259}No | 58(5) min | — | 7.455 (9.8); 7.500 (29.3); 7.533 (17.3) | — | 4.63×10^{20} | — |
| ^{256}Lr | 27(3) s | < 0.03 | 8.319 (5.4); 8.390 (16); 8.430 (33) | — | 5.96×10^{22} | — |
| ^{257}Lr | 646(25) ms | — | 8.796 (18); 8.861 (82) | — | 1.54×10^{24} | — |

Actinides have 89–103 protons and usually 117–159 neutrons.

Thirty-four isotopes of actinium and eight excited isomeric states of some of its nuclides are known, ranging in mass number from 203 to 236. Three isotopes, ^{225}Ac, ^{227}Ac and ^{228}Ac, were found in nature and the others were produced in the laboratory; only the three natural isotopes are used in applications. Actinium-225 is a member of the radioactive neptunium series; it was first discovered in 1947 as a decay product of uranium-233 and it is an α-emitter with a half-life of 10 days. Actinium-225 is less available than actinium-228, but is more promising in radiotracer applications. Actinium-227 (half-life 21.77 years) occurs in all uranium ores, but in small quantities. One gram of uranium (in radioactive equilibrium) contains only 2×10^{−10} gram of ^{227}Ac. Actinium-228 is a member of the radioactive thorium series formed by the decay of ^{228}Ra; it is a β^{−} emitter with a half-life of 6.15 hours. In one tonne of thorium there is 5×10^{−8} gram of ^{228}Ac. It was discovered by Otto Hahn in 1906.

There are 32 known isotopes of thorium ranging in mass number from 207 to 238. Of these, the longest-lived is ^{232}Th, whose half-life of 1.4×10^{10} years means that it still exists in nature as a primordial nuclide. The next longest-lived is ^{230}Th, an intermediate decay product of ^{238}U with a half-life of 75,400 years. Several other thorium isotopes have half-lives over a day; all of these are also transient in the decay chains of ^{232}Th, ^{235}U, and ^{238}U.

Twenty-nine isotopes of protactinium are known with mass numbers 211–239 as well as three excited isomeric states. Only ^{231}Pa and ^{234}Pa have been found in nature. All the isotopes have short lifetimes, except for protactinium-231 (half-life 32,760 years). The most important isotopes are ^{231}Pa and ^{233}Pa, which is an intermediate product in obtaining uranium-233 and is the most affordable among artificial isotopes of protactinium. ^{233}Pa has convenient half-life and energy of γ-radiation, and thus was used in most studies of protactinium chemistry. Protactinium-233 is a β-emitter with a half-life of 26.97 days.

There are 27 known isotopes of uranium, having mass numbers 215–242 (except 220). Three of them, ^{234}U, ^{235}U and ^{238}U, are present in appreciable quantities in nature. Among others, the most important is ^{233}U, which is a final product of transformation of ^{232}Th irradiated by slow neutrons. ^{233}U has a much higher fission efficiency by low-energy (thermal) neutrons, compared e.g. with ^{235}U. Most uranium chemistry studies were carried out on uranium-238 owing to its long half-life of 4.4×10^{9} years.

There are 25 isotopes of neptunium with mass numbers 219–244 (except 221); they are all highly radioactive. The most popular among scientists are long-lived ^{237}Np (t_{1/2} = 2.20×10^{6} years) and short-lived ^{239}Np, ^{238}Np (t_{1/2} ~ 2 days).

There are 21 known isotopes of plutonium, having mass numbers 227–247. The most stable isotope of plutonium is ^{244}Pu with half-life of 8.13×10^{7} years.

Eighteen isotopes of americium are known with mass numbers from 229 to 247 (with the exception of 231). The most important are ^{241}Am and ^{243}Am, which are alpha-emitters and also emit soft, but intense γ-rays; both of them can be obtained in an isotopically pure form. Chemical properties of americium were first studied with ^{241}Am, but later shifted to ^{243}Am, which is almost 20 times less radioactive. The disadvantage of ^{243}Am is production of the short-lived daughter isotope ^{239}Np, which has to be considered in the data analysis.

Among 19 isotopes of curium, ranging in mass number from 233 to 251, the most accessible are ^{242}Cm and ^{244}Cm; they are α-emitters, but with much shorter lifetime than the americium isotopes. These isotopes emit almost no γ-radiation, but undergo spontaneous fission with the associated emission of neutrons. More long-lived isotopes of curium (^{245–248}Cm, all α-emitters) are formed as a mixture during neutron irradiation of plutonium or americium. Upon short irradiation, this mixture is dominated by ^{246}Cm, and then ^{248}Cm begins to accumulate. Both of these isotopes, especially ^{248}Cm, have a longer half-life (3.48×10^{5} years) and are much more convenient for carrying out chemical research than ^{242}Cm and ^{244}Cm, but they also have a rather high rate of spontaneous fission. ^{247}Cm has the longest lifetime among isotopes of curium (1.56×10^{7} years), but is not formed in large quantities because of the strong fission induced by thermal neutrons.

Seventeen isotopes of berkelium have been identified with mass numbers 233, 234, 236, 238, and 240–252. Only ^{249}Bk is available in large quantities; it has a relatively short half-life of 330 days and emits mostly soft β-particles, which are inconvenient for detection. Its alpha radiation is rather weak (1.45×10^{−3}% with respect to β-radiation), but is sometimes used to detect this isotope. ^{247}Bk is an alpha-emitter with a long half-life of 1,380 years, but it is hard to obtain in appreciable quantities; it is not formed upon neutron irradiation of plutonium because β-decay of curium isotopes with mass number below 248 is not known. (^{247}Cm would actually release energy by β-decaying to ^{247}Bk, but this has never been seen.)

The 20 isotopes of californium with mass numbers 237–256 are formed in nuclear reactors; californium-253 is a β-emitter and the rest are α-emitters. The isotopes with even mass numbers (^{250}Cf, ^{252}Cf and ^{254}Cf) have a high rate of spontaneous fission, especially ^{254}Cf of which 99.7% decays by spontaneous fission. Californium-249 has a relatively long half-life (352 years), weak spontaneous fission and strong γ-emission that facilitates its identification. ^{249}Cf is not formed in large quantities in a nuclear reactor because of the slow β-decay of the parent isotope ^{249}Bk and a large cross section of interaction with neutrons, but it can be accumulated in the isotopically pure form as the β-decay product of (pre-selected) ^{249}Bk. Californium produced by reactor-irradiation of plutonium mostly consists of ^{250}Cf and ^{252}Cf, the latter being predominant for large neutron fluences, and its study is hindered by the strong neutron radiation.

Properties of some transplutonium isotope pairs
| Parent isotope | t_{1/2} | Daughter isotope | t_{1/2} | Time to establish radioactive equilibrium |
|---|---|---|---|---|
| ^{243}Am | 7370 years | ^{239}Np | 2.35 days | 47.3 days |
| ^{245}Cm | 8265 years | ^{241}Pu | 14 years | 129 years |
| ^{247}Cm | 1.64×10^{7} years | ^{243}Pu | 4.95 hours | 7.2 days |
| ^{254}Es | 270 days | ^{250}Bk | 3.2 hours | 35.2 hours |
| ^{255}Es | 39.8 days | ^{255}Fm | 22 hours | 5 days |
| ^{257}Fm | 79 days | ^{253}Cf | 17.6 days | 49 days |

Among the 18 known isotopes of einsteinium with mass numbers from 240 to 257, the most affordable is ^{253}Es. It is an α-emitter with a half-life of 20.47 days, a relatively weak γ-emission and small spontaneous fission rate as compared with the isotopes of californium. Prolonged neutron irradiation also produces a long-lived isotope ^{254}Es (t_{1/2} = 275.5 days).

Twenty isotopes of fermium are known with mass numbers of 241–260. ^{254}Fm, ^{255}Fm and ^{256}Fm are α-emitters with a short half-life (hours), which can be isolated in significant amounts. ^{257}Fm (t_{1/2} = 100 days) can accumulate upon prolonged and strong irradiation. All these isotopes are characterized by high rates of spontaneous fission.

Among the 17 known isotopes of mendelevium (mass numbers from 244 to 260), the most studied is ^{256}Md, which mainly decays through electron capture (α-radiation is ≈10%) with a half-life of 77 minutes. Another alpha emitter, ^{258}Md, has a half-life of 53 days. Both these isotopes are produced from rare einsteinium (^{253}Es and ^{255}Es respectively), that therefore limits their availability.

Long-lived isotopes of nobelium and isotopes of lawrencium (and of heavier elements) have relatively short half-lives. For nobelium, 13 isotopes are known, with mass numbers 249–260 and 262. The chemical properties of nobelium and lawrencium were studied with ^{255}No (t_{1/2} = 3 min) and ^{256}Lr (t_{1/2} = 35 s). The longest-lived nobelium isotope, ^{259}No, has a half-life of approximately 1 hour. Lawrencium has 14 known isotopes with mass numbers 251–262, 264, and 266. The most stable of them is ^{266}Lr with a half-life of 11 hours.

Among all of these, the only isotopes that occur in sufficient quantities in nature to be detected in anything more than traces and have a measurable contribution to the atomic weights of the actinides are the primordial ^{232}Th, ^{235}U, and ^{238}U, and three long-lived decay products of natural uranium, ^{230}Th, ^{231}Pa, and ^{234}U. Natural thorium consists of 0.02(2)% ^{230}Th and 99.98(2)% ^{232}Th; natural protactinium consists of 100% ^{231}Pa; and natural uranium consists of 0.0054(5)% ^{234}U, 0.7204(6)% ^{235}U, and 99.2742(10)% ^{238}U.

== Formation in nuclear reactors ==
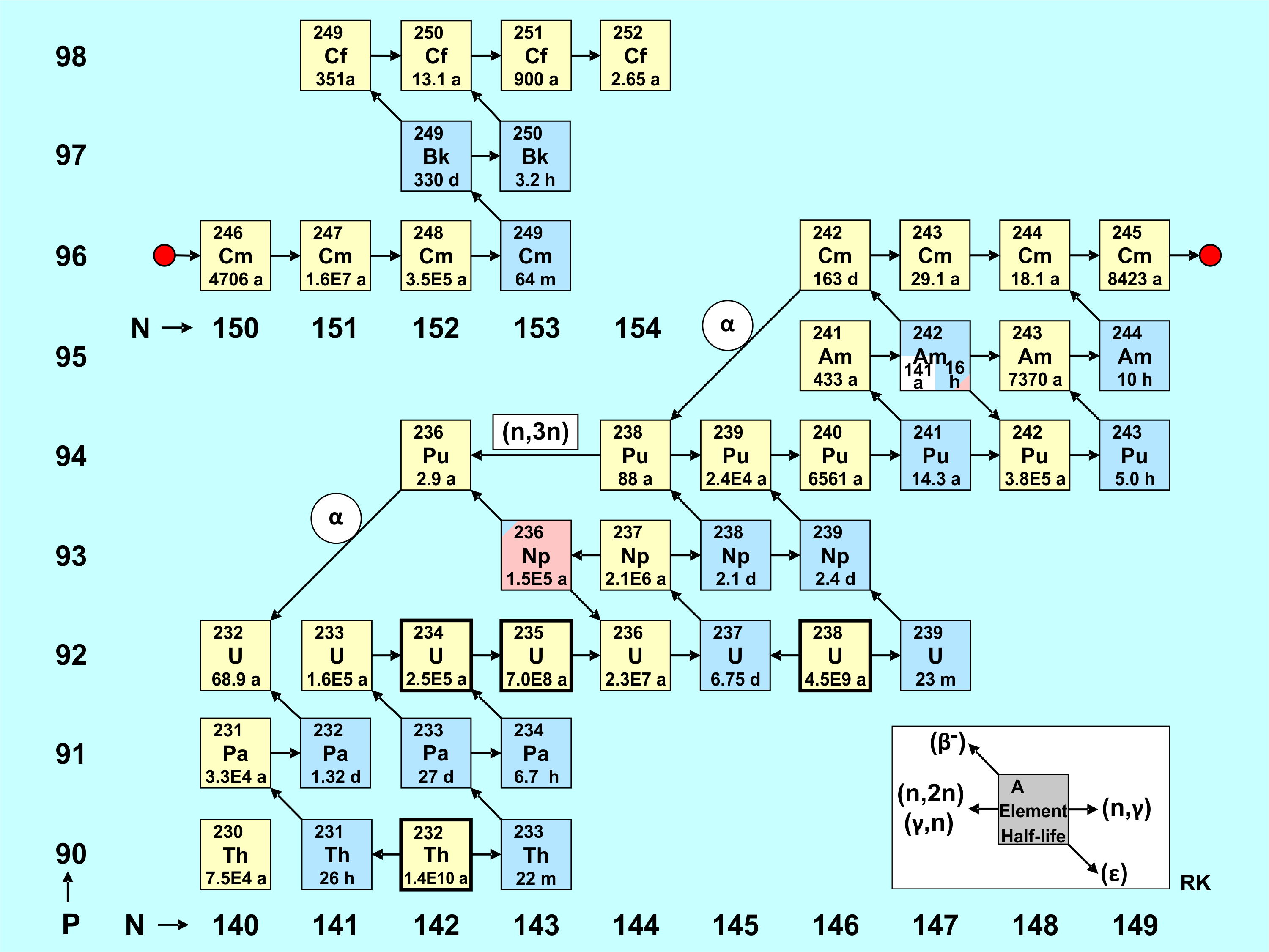
Table of nuclides: Buildup of actinides in a nuclear reactor, including radioactive decay

The figure buildup of actinides is a table of nuclides with the number of neutrons on the horizontal axis (isotopes) and the number of protons on the vertical axis (elements). The red dot divides the nuclides in two groups, so the figure is more compact. Each nuclide is represented by a square with the mass number of the element and its half-life. Naturally existing actinide isotopes (Th, U) are marked with a bold border, alpha emitters have a yellow colour, and beta emitters have a blue colour. Pink indicates electron capture (^{236}Np), whereas white stands for a long-lasting metastable state (^{242}Am).

The formation of actinide nuclides is primarily characterised by:

- Neutron capture reactions (n,γ), which are represented in the figure by a short right arrow.
- The (n,2n) reactions and the less frequently occurring (γ,n) reactions are also taken into account, both of which are marked by a short left arrow.
- Even more rarely and only triggered by fast neutrons, the (n,3n) reaction occurs, which is represented in the figure with one example, marked by a long left arrow.

In addition to these neutron- or gamma-induced nuclear reactions, the radioactive conversion of actinide nuclides also affects the nuclide inventory in a reactor. These decay types are marked in the figure by diagonal arrows. The beta-minus decay, marked with an arrow pointing up-left, plays a major role for the balance of the particle densities of the nuclides. Nuclides decaying by positron emission (beta-plus decay) or electron capture (ϵ) do not occur in a nuclear reactor except as products of knockout reactions; their decays are marked with arrows pointing down-right. Due to the long half-lives of the given nuclides, alpha decay plays almost no role in the formation and decay of the actinides in a power reactor, as the residence time of the nuclear fuel in the reactor core is rather short (a few years). Exceptions are the two relatively short-lived nuclides ^{242}Cm (T_{1/2} = 163 d) and ^{236}Pu (T_{1/2} = 2.9 y). Only for these two cases, the α decay is marked on the nuclide map by a long arrow pointing down-left. A few long-lived actinide isotopes, such as ^{244}Pu and ^{250}Cm, cannot be produced in reactors because neutron capture does not happen quickly enough to bypass the short-lived beta-decaying nuclides ^{243}Pu and ^{249}Cm; they can however be generated in nuclear explosions, which have much higher neutron fluxes.

== Distribution in nature ==
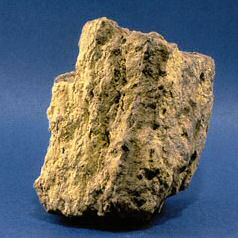
Unprocessed uranium ore

Thorium and uranium are the most abundant actinides in nature with the respective mass concentrations of 16 ppm and 4 ppm. Uranium mostly occurs in the Earth's crust as a mixture of its oxides in the mineral uraninite, which is also called pitchblende because of its black color. There are several dozens of other uranium minerals such as carnotite (KUO_{2}VO_{4}·3H_{2}O) and autunite (Ca(UO_{2})_{2}(PO_{4})_{2}·nH_{2}O). The isotopic composition of natural uranium is ^{238}U (relative abundance 99.2742%), ^{235}U (0.7204%) and ^{234}U (0.0054%); of these ^{238}U has the largest half-life of 4.51×10^{9} years. The worldwide production of uranium in 2009 amounted to 50,572 tonnes, of which 27.3% was mined in Kazakhstan. Other important uranium mining countries are Canada (20.1%), Australia (15.7%), Namibia (9.1%), Russia (7.0%), and Niger (6.4%).

Content of plutonium in uranium and thorium ores
| Ore | Location | Uranium content, % | Mass ratio^{239}Pu/ore | Ratio^{239}Pu/U (×10^{−12}) |
|---|---|---|---|---|
| Uraninite | Canada | 13.5 | 9.1×10^{−12} | 7.1 |
| Uraninite | Congo | 38 | 4.8×10^{−12} | 12 |
| Uraninite | Colorado, US | 50 | 3.8×10^{−12} | 7.7 |
| Monazite | Brazil | 0.24 | 2.1×10^{−14} | 8.3 |
| Monazite | North Carolina, US | 1.64 | 5.9×10^{−14} | 3.6 |
| Fergusonite | - | 0.25 | <1×10^{−14} | <4 |
| Carnotite | - | 10 | <4×10^{−14} | <0.4 |

The most abundant thorium minerals are thorianite (ThO_{2}), thorite (ThSiO_{4}) and monazite, ((Th,Ca,Ce)PO_{4}). Most thorium minerals contain uranium and vice versa; and they all have significant fraction of lanthanides. Rich deposits of thorium minerals are located in the United States (440,000 tonnes), Australia and India (~300,000 tonnes each) and Canada (~100,000 tonnes).

The abundance of actinium in the Earth's crust is only about 5×10^{−15}%. Actinium is mostly present in uranium-containing, but also in other minerals, though in much smaller quantities. The content of actinium in most natural objects corresponds to the isotopic equilibrium of parent isotope ^{235}U, and it is not affected by the weak Ac migration. Protactinium is more abundant (10^{−12}%) in the Earth's crust than actinium. It was discovered in uranium ore in 1913 by Fajans and Göhring. As actinium, the distribution of protactinium follows that of ^{235}U.

The half-life of the longest-lived isotope of neptunium, ^{237}Np, is negligible compared to the age of the Earth. Thus neptunium is present in nature in negligible amounts produced as intermediate decay products of other isotopes. Traces of plutonium in uranium minerals were first found in 1942, and the more systematic results on ^{239}Pu are summarized in the table (no other plutonium isotopes could be detected in those samples). The upper limit of abundance of the longest-living isotope of plutonium, ^{244}Pu, is 3×10^{−20}%. Plutonium could not be detected in samples of lunar soil. Owing to its scarcity in nature, most plutonium is produced synthetically.

== Extraction ==
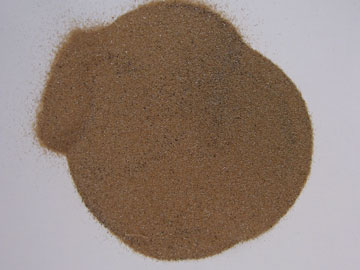
Monazite: a major thorium mineral

Owing to the low abundance of actinides, their extraction is a complex, multistep process. Fluorides of actinides are usually used because they are insoluble in water and can be easily separated with redox reactions. Fluorides are reduced with calcium, magnesium or barium:

$$\begin{array}{l}{}\\
\ce{2AmF3{} + 3Ba ->[\ce{1150-1350^\circ C}] 3BaF2{} + 2Am}\\
\ce{PuF4{} + 2Ba ->[\ce{1200^\circ C}] 2BaF2{} + Pu}\\
\ce{UF4{} + 2Mg ->[\ce{> 500^\circ C}] U{} + 2MgF2}\\{}
\end{array}$$

Among the actinides, thorium and uranium are the easiest to isolate. Thorium is extracted mostly from monazite: thorium pyrophosphate (ThP_{2}O_{7}) is reacted with nitric acid, and the produced thorium nitrate treated with tributyl phosphate. Rare-earth impurities are separated by increasing the pH in sulfate solution.

In another extraction method, monazite is decomposed with a 45% aqueous solution of sodium hydroxide at 140 °C. Mixed metal hydroxides are extracted first, filtered at 80 °C, washed with water and dissolved with concentrated hydrochloric acid. Next, the acidic solution is neutralized with hydroxides to pH = 5.8 that results in precipitation of thorium hydroxide (Th(OH)_{4}) contaminated with ~3% of rare-earth hydroxides; the rest of rare-earth hydroxides remains in solution. Thorium hydroxide is dissolved in an inorganic acid and then purified from the rare earth elements. An efficient method is the dissolution of thorium hydroxide in nitric acid, because the resulting solution can be purified by extraction with organic solvents:

Separation of uranium and plutonium from spent nuclear fuel using the PUREX process

Th(OH)_{4} + 4 HNO_{3} → Th(NO_{3})_{4} + 4 H_{2}O

Metallic thorium is separated from the anhydrous oxide, chloride or fluoride by reacting it with calcium in an inert atmosphere:

ThO_{2} + 2 Ca → 2 CaO + Th

Sometimes thorium is extracted by electrolysis of a fluoride in a mixture of sodium and potassium chloride at 700–800 °C in a graphite crucible. Highly pure thorium can be extracted from its iodide with the crystal bar process.

Uranium is extracted from its ores in various ways. In one method, the ore is burned and then reacted with nitric acid to convert uranium into a dissolved state. Treating the solution with a solution of tributyl phosphate (TBP) in kerosene transforms uranium into an organic form UO_{2}(NO_{3})_{2}(TBP)_{2}. The insoluble impurities are filtered and the uranium is extracted by reaction with hydroxides as (NH_{4})_{2}U_{2}O_{7} or with hydrogen peroxide as UO_{4}·2H_{2}O.

When the uranium ore is rich in such minerals as dolomite, magnesite, etc., those minerals consume much acid. In this case, the carbonate method is used for uranium extraction. Its main component is an aqueous solution of sodium carbonate, which converts uranium into a complex [UO_{2}(CO_{3})_{3}]^{4−}, which is stable in aqueous solutions at low concentrations of hydroxide ions. The advantages of the sodium carbonate method are that the chemicals have low corrosivity (compared to nitrates) and that most non-uranium metals precipitate from the solution. The disadvantage is that tetravalent uranium compounds precipitate as well. Therefore, the uranium ore is treated with sodium carbonate at elevated temperature and under oxygen pressure:

2 UO_{2} + O_{2} + 6 CO^{2−}_{3} → 2 [UO_{2}(CO_{3})_{3}]^{4−}

This equation suggests that the best solvent for the uranyl carbonate processing is a mixture of carbonate with bicarbonate. At high pH, this results in precipitation of diuranate, which is treated with hydrogen in the presence of nickel yielding an insoluble uranium tetracarbonate.

Another separation method uses polymeric resins as a polyelectrolyte. Ion exchange processes in the resins result in separation of uranium. Uranium from resins is washed with a solution of ammonium nitrate or nitric acid that yields uranyl nitrate, UO_{2}(NO_{3})_{2}·6H_{2}O. When heated, it turns into UO_{3}, which is converted to UO_{2} with hydrogen:

UO_{3} + H_{2} → UO_{2} + H_{2}O

Reacting uranium dioxide with hydrofluoric acid changes it to uranium tetrafluoride, which yields uranium metal upon reaction with magnesium metal:

4 HF + UO_{2} → UF_{4} + 2 H_{2}O

To extract plutonium, neutron-irradiated uranium is dissolved in nitric acid, and a reducing agent (FeSO_{4}, or H_{2}O_{2}) is added to the resulting solution. This addition changes the oxidation state of plutonium from +6 to +4, while uranium remains in the form of uranyl nitrate (UO_{2}(NO_{3})_{2}). The solution is treated with a reducing agent and neutralized with ammonium carbonate to pH = 8 that results in precipitation of Pu^{4+} compounds.

In another method, Pu^{4+} and UO^{2+}_{2} are first extracted with tributyl phosphate, then reacted with hydrazine washing out the recovered plutonium.

The major difficulty in separation of actinium is the similarity of its properties with those of lanthanum. Thus actinium is either synthesized in nuclear reactions from isotopes of radium or separated using ion-exchange procedures.

== Properties ==
Actinides have similar properties to lanthanides. Just as the 4f electron shells are filled in the lanthanides, the 5f electron shells are filled in the actinides. Because the 5f, 6d, 7s, and 7p shells are close in energy, many irregular configurations arise; thus, in gas-phase atoms, just as the first 4f electron only appears in cerium, so the first 5f electron appears even later, in protactinium. However, just as lanthanum is the first element to use the 4f shell in compounds, so actinium is the first element to use the 5f shell in compounds. The f-shells complete their filling together, at ytterbium and nobelium. The first experimental evidence for the filling of the 5f shell in actinides was obtained by McMillan and Abelson in 1940. As in lanthanides (see lanthanide contraction), the ionic radius of actinides monotonically decreases with atomic number (see also actinoid contraction).

The shift of electron configurations in the gas phase does not always match the chemical behaviour. For example, the early-transition-metal-like prominence of the highest oxidation state, corresponding to removal of all valence electrons, extends up to uranium even though the 5f shells begin filling before that. On the other hand, electron configurations resembling the lanthanide congeners already begin at plutonium, even though lanthanide-like behaviour does not become dominant until the second half of the series begins at curium. The elements between uranium and curium form a transition between these two kinds of behaviour, where higher oxidation states continue to exist, but lose stability with respect to the +3 state. The +2 state becomes more important near the end of the series, and is the most stable oxidation state for nobelium, the last 5f element. Oxidation states rise again only after nobelium, showing that a new series of 6d transition metals has begun: lawrencium shows only the +3 oxidation state, and rutherfordium only the +4 state, making them respectively congeners of lutetium and hafnium in the 5d row.

Properties of actinides (the mass of the most long-lived isotope is in square brackets)
| Element | Ac | Th | Pa | U | Np | Pu | Am | Cm | Bk | Cf | Es | Fm | Md | No | Lr |
| Core charge (Z) | 89 | 90 | 91 | 92 | 93 | 94 | 95 | 96 | 97 | 98 | 99 | 100 | 101 | 102 | 103 |
| Image | | | | | | | | | | | | | | | |
|---|---|---|---|---|---|---|---|---|---|---|---|---|---|---|---|
| Atomic mass | [227] | 232.0377(4) | 231.03588(2) | 238.02891(3) | [237] | [244] | [243] | [247] | [247] | [251] | [252] | [257] | [258] | [259] | [266] |
| Number of natural isotopes | 3 | 8 | 3 | 8 | 3 | 4 | 0 | 0 | 0 | 0 | 0 | 0 | 0 | 0 | 0 |
| Natural isotopes | 225, 227, 228 | 227–234 | 231, 233, 234 | 233–240 | 237, 239, 240 | 238–240, 244 | — | — | — | — | — | — | — | — | — |
| Natural quantity isotopes | — | 230, 232 | 231 | 234, 235, 238 | — | — | — | — | — | — | — | — | — | — | — |
| Longest-lived isotope | 227 | 232 | 231 | 238 | 237 | 244 | 243 | 247 | 247 | 251 | 252 | 257 | 258 | 259 | 266 |
| Half-life of the longest-lived isotope | 21.8 years | 14 billion years (1.4×10^{10} years) | 32,500 years | 4.47 billion years (4.47×10^{9} years) | 2.14 million years (2,140,000 years) | 80.8 million years (80,800,000 years) | 7,370 years | 15.6 million years (15,600,000 years) | 1,380 years | 900 years | 1.29 years | 100.5 d | 52 d | 58 min | 11 h |
| Most common isotope | 227 | 232 | 231 | 238 | 237 | 239 | 241 | 244 | 249 | 252 | 253 | 255 | 256 | 255 | 260 |
| Half-life of the most common isotope | 21.8 years | 14 billion years (1.4×10^{10} years) | 32,500 years | 4.47 billion years (4.47×10^{9} years) | 2.14 million years (2,140,000 years) | 24,100 years | 433 years | 18.1 years | 320 d | 2.64 years | 20.47 d | 20.07 h | 78 min | 3.1 min | 2.7 min |
| Electronic configuration in the ground state (gas phase) | 6d^{1}7s^{2} | 6d^{2}7s^{2} | 5f^{2}6d^{1}7s^{2} | 5f^{3}6d^{1}7s^{2} | 5f^{4}6d^{1}7s^{2} | 5f^{6}7s^{2} | 5f^{7}7s^{2} | 5f^{7}6d^{1}7s^{2} | 5f^{9}7s^{2} | 5f^{10}7s^{2} | 5f^{11}7s^{2} | 5f^{12}7s^{2} | 5f^{13}7s^{2} | 5f^{14}7s^{2} | 5f^{14}7s^{2}7p^{1} |
| Oxidation states | 2, 3 | 2, 3, 4 | 2, 3, 4, 5 | 2, 3, 4, 5, 6 | 3, 4, 5, 6, 7 | 3, 4, 5, 6, 7 | 2, 3, 4, 5, 6, 7 | 2, 3, 4, 6 | 2, 3, 4 | 2, 3, 4 | 2, 3, 4 | 2, 3 | 2, 3 | 2, 3 | 3 |
| Metallic radius (nm) | 0.203 | 0.180 | 0.162 | 0.153 | 0.150 | 0.162 | 0.173 | 0.174 | 0.170 | 0.186 | 0.186 | ? 0.198 | ? 0.194 | ? 0.197 | ? 0.171 |
| Ionic radius (nm): An^{4+} An^{3+} | — 0.126 | 0.114 — | 0.104; 0.118 | 0.103; 0.118 | 0.101; 0.116 | 0.100; 0.115 | 0.099; 0.114 | 0.099; 0.112 | 0.097; 0.110 | 0.096; 0.109 | 0.085; 0.098 | 0.084; 0.091 | 0.084; 0.090 | 0.084; 0.095 | 0.083; 0.088 |
| Temperature (°C): melting boiling | 1050; 3198 | 1842; 4788 | 1568 ? 4027 | 1132.2; 4131 | 639 ? 4174 | 639.4; 3228 | 1176 ? 2607 | 1340; 3110 | 986; 2627 | 900 ? 1470 | 860 ? 996 | 1530 — | 830 — | 830 — | 1630 — |
| Density, g/cm^{3} | 10.07 | 11.78 | 15.37 | 19.06 | 20.45 | 19.84 | 11.7 | 13.51 | 14.78 | 15.1 | 8.84 | ? 9.7 | ? 10.3 | ? 9.9 | ? 14.4 |
| Standard electrode potential (V): E° (An^{4+}/An^{0}) E° (An^{3+}/An^{0}) | — −2.13 | −1.83 — | −1.47 — | −1.38 −1.66 | −1.30 −1.79 | −1.25 −2.00 | −0.90 −2.07 | −0.75 −2.06 | −0.55 −1.96 | −0.59 −1.97 | −0.36 −1.98 | −0.29 −1.96 | — −1.74 | — −1.20 | — −2.10 |
| Color: [M(H_{2}O)_{n}]^{4+} [M(H_{2}O)_{n}]^{3+} | — Colorless | Colorless; Blue | Yellow; Dark blue | Green; Purple | Yellow-green; Purple | Brown; Violet | Red; Rose | Yellow; Colorless | Beige; Yellow-green | Green; Green | — Pink | — — | — — | — — | — — |

Approximate colors of actinide ions in aqueous solution Colors for the actinides 100–103 are unknown as sufficient quantities have not yet been synthesized. The colour of CmO^{2+}_{2} was likewise not recorded.
| Actinide (Z) | 89 | 90 | 91 | 92 | 93 | 94 | 95 | 96 | 97 | 98 | 99 | 100 | 101 | 102 | 103 |
| Oxidation state | | | | | | | | | | | | | | | |
|---|---|---|---|---|---|---|---|---|---|---|---|---|---|---|---|
| +2 | | | | | | | | | | | | Fm^{2+} | Md^{2+} | No^{2+} | |
| +3 | Ac^{3+} | Th^{3+} | Pa^{3+} | U^{3+} | Np^{3+} | Pu^{3+} | Am^{3+} | Cm^{3+} | Bk^{3+} | Cf^{3+} | Es^{3+} | Fm^{3+} | Md^{3+} | No^{3+} | Lr^{3+} |
| +4 | | Th^{4+} | Pa^{4+} | U^{4+} | Np^{4+} | Pu^{4+} | Am^{4+} | Cm^{4+} | Bk^{4+} | Cf^{4+} | | | | | |
| +5 | | | PaO^{+}_{2} | UO^{+}_{2} | NpO^{+}_{2} | PuO^{+}_{2} | AmO^{+}_{2} | | | | | | | | |
| +6 | | | | UO^{2+}_{2} | NpO^{2+}_{2} | PuO^{2+}_{2} | AmO^{2+}_{2} | CmO^{2+}_{2} | | | | | | | |
| +7 | | | | | NpO^{3+}_{2} | PuO^{3+}_{2} | AmO^{3−}_{5} | | | | | | | | |

=== Physical properties ===
| Major crystal structures of some actinides vs. temperature | Metallic and ionic radii of actinides |

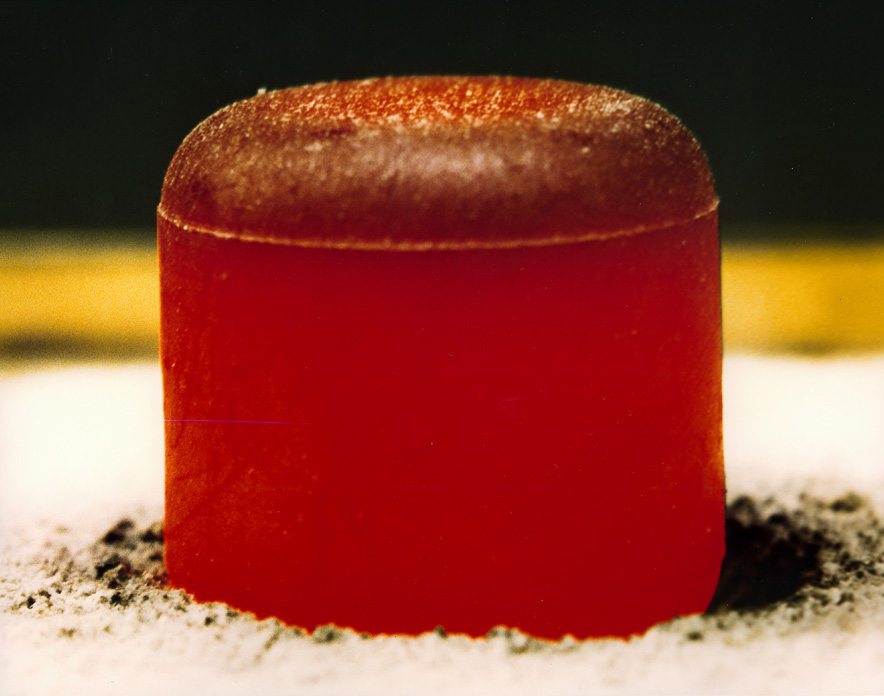
A pellet of ^{238}PuO_{2} to be used in a radioisotope thermoelectric generator for either the Cassini or Galileo mission. The pellet produces 62 watts of heat and glows because of the heat generated by the radioactive decay (primarily α). Photo is taken after insulating the pellet under a graphite blanket for minutes and removing the blanket.

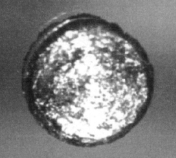
Californium

Actinides are typical metals. All of them are soft and have a silvery color (but tarnish in air), relatively high density and plasticity. Some of them can be cut with a knife. Their electrical resistivity varies between 15 and 150 μΩ·cm. The hardness of thorium is similar to that of soft steel, so heated pure thorium can be rolled in sheets and pulled into wire. Thorium is nearly half as dense as uranium and plutonium, but is harder than either of them. All actinides are radioactive, paramagnetic, and, with the exception of actinium, have several crystalline phases: plutonium has seven, and uranium, neptunium and californium three. The crystal structures of protactinium, uranium, neptunium and plutonium do not have clear analogs among the lanthanides and are more similar to those of the 3d-transition metals.

All actinides are pyrophoric, especially when finely divided, that is, they spontaneously ignite upon reaction with air at room temperature. The melting point of actinides does not have a clear dependence on the number of f-electrons. The unusually low melting point of neptunium and plutonium (~640 °C) is explained by hybridization of 5f and 6d orbitals and the formation of directional bonds in these metals.

Comparison of ionic radii of lanthanides and actinides
| Lanthanides | Ln^{3+}, Å | Actinides | An^{3+}, Å | An^{4+}, Å |
|---|---|---|---|---|
| Lanthanum | 1.061 | Actinium | 1.11 | – |
| Cerium | 1.034 | Thorium | 1.08 | 0.99 |
| Praseodymium | 1.013 | Protactinium | 1.05 | 0.93 |
| Neodymium | 0.995 | Uranium | 1.03 | 0.93 |
| Promethium | 0.979 | Neptunium | 1.01 | 0.92 |
| Samarium | 0.964 | Plutonium | 1.00 | 0.90 |
| Europium | 0.950 | Americium | 0.99 | 0.89 |
| Gadolinium | 0.938 | Curium | 0.98 | 0.88 |
| Terbium | 0.923 | Berkelium | – | – |
| Dysprosium | 0.908 | Californium | – | – |
| Holmium | 0.894 | Einsteinium | – | – |
| Erbium | 0.881 | Fermium | – | – |
| Thulium | 0.869 | Mendelevium | – | – |
| Ytterbium | 0.858 | Nobelium | – | – |
| Lutetium | 0.848 | Lawrencium | – | – |

=== Chemical properties ===
Like the lanthanides, all actinides are highly reactive with halogens and chalcogens; however, the actinides react more easily. Actinides, especially those with a small number of 5f-electrons, are prone to hybridization. This is explained by the similarity of the electron energies at the 5f, 7s and 6d shells. Most actinides exhibit a larger variety of valence states, and the most stable are +6 for uranium, +5 for protactinium and neptunium, +4 for thorium and plutonium and +3 for actinium and other actinides.

Actinium is chemically similar to lanthanum, which is explained by their similar ionic radii and electronic structures. Like lanthanum, actinium almost always has an oxidation state of +3 in compounds, but it is less reactive and has more pronounced basic properties. Among other trivalent actinides Ac^{3+} is least acidic, i.e. has the weakest tendency to hydrolyze in aqueous solutions.

Thorium is rather active chemically. Owing to lack of electrons on 6d and 5f orbitals, tetravalent thorium compounds are colorless. At pH < 3, solutions of thorium salts are dominated by the cations [Th(H_{2}O)_{8}]^{4+}. The Th^{4+} ion is relatively large, and depending on the coordination number can have a radius between 0.95 and 1.14 Å. As a result, thorium salts have a weak tendency to hydrolyse. The distinctive ability of thorium salts is their high solubility both in water and polar organic solvents.

Protactinium exhibits two valence states; the +5 is stable, and the +4 state easily oxidizes to protactinium(V). Thus tetravalent protactinium in solutions is obtained by the action of strong reducing agents in a hydrogen atmosphere. Tetravalent protactinium is chemically similar to uranium(IV) and thorium(IV). Fluorides, phosphates, hypophosphates, iodates and phenylarsonates of protactinium(IV) are insoluble in water and dilute acids. Protactinium forms soluble carbonates. The hydrolytic properties of pentavalent protactinium are close to those of tantalum(V) and niobium(V). The complex chemical behavior of protactinium is a consequence of the start of the filling of the 5f shell in this element.

Uranium has a valence from 3 to 6, the last being most stable. In the hexavalent state, uranium is very similar to the group 6 elements. Many compounds of uranium(IV) and uranium(VI) are non-stoichiometric, i.e. have variable composition. For example, the actual chemical formula of uranium dioxide is UO_{2+x}, where x varies between −0.4 and 0.32. Uranium(VI) compounds are weak oxidants. Most of them contain the linear "uranyl" group, UO^{2+}_{2}. Between 4 and 6 ligands can be accommodated in an equatorial plane perpendicular to the uranyl group. The uranyl group acts as a hard acid and forms stronger complexes with oxygen-donor ligands than with nitrogen-donor ligands. NpO^{2+}_{2} and PuO^{2+}_{2} are also the common form of Np and Pu in the +6 oxidation state. Uranium(IV) compounds exhibit reducing properties, e.g., they are easily oxidized by atmospheric oxygen. Uranium(III) is a very strong reducing agent. Owing to the presence of d-shell, uranium (as well as many other actinides) forms organometallic compounds, such as U^{III}(C_{5}H_{5})_{3} and U^{IV}(C_{5}H_{5})_{4}.

Neptunium has valence states from 3 to 7, which can be simultaneously observed in solutions. The most stable state in solution is +5, but the valence +4 is preferred in solid neptunium compounds. Neptunium metal is very reactive. Ions of neptunium are prone to hydrolysis and formation of coordination compounds.

Plutonium also exhibits valence states between 3 and 7 inclusive, and thus is chemically similar to neptunium and uranium. It is highly reactive, and quickly forms an oxide film in air. Plutonium reacts with hydrogen even at temperatures as low as 25–50 °C; it also easily forms halides and intermetallic compounds. Hydrolysis reactions of plutonium ions of different oxidation states are quite diverse. Plutonium(V) can enter polymerization reactions.

The largest chemical diversity among actinides is observed in americium, which can have valence between 2 and 6. Divalent americium is obtained only in dry compounds and non-aqueous solutions (acetonitrile). Oxidation states +3, +5 and +6 are typical for aqueous solutions, but also in the solid state. Tetravalent americium forms stable solid compounds (dioxide, fluoride and hydroxide) as well as complexes in aqueous solutions. It was reported that in alkaline solution americium can be oxidized to the heptavalent state, but these data proved erroneous. The most stable valence of americium is 3 in aqueous solution and 3 or 4 in solid compounds.

Valence 3 is dominant in all subsequent elements up to lawrencium (with the exception of nobelium). Curium can be tetravalent in solids (fluoride, dioxide). Berkelium, along with a valence of +3, also shows the valence of +4, more stable than that of curium; the valence 4 is observed in solid fluoride and dioxide. The stability of Bk^{4+} in aqueous solution is close to that of Ce^{4+}. Only valence 3 was observed for californium, einsteinium and fermium. The divalent state is proven for mendelevium and nobelium, and in nobelium it is more stable than the trivalent state. Lawrencium shows valence 3 both in solutions and solids.

The redox potential $\ce{\mathit E_\frac{M^4+}{AnO2^2+}}$ increases from −0.32 V in uranium, through 0.34 V (Np) and 1.04 V (Pu) to 1.34 V in americium revealing the increasing reduction ability of the An^{4+} ion from americium to uranium. All actinides form AnH_{3} hydrides of black color with salt-like properties. Actinides also produce carbides with the general formula of AnC or AnC_{2} (U_{2}C_{3} for uranium) as well as sulfides An_{2}S_{3} and AnS_{2}.

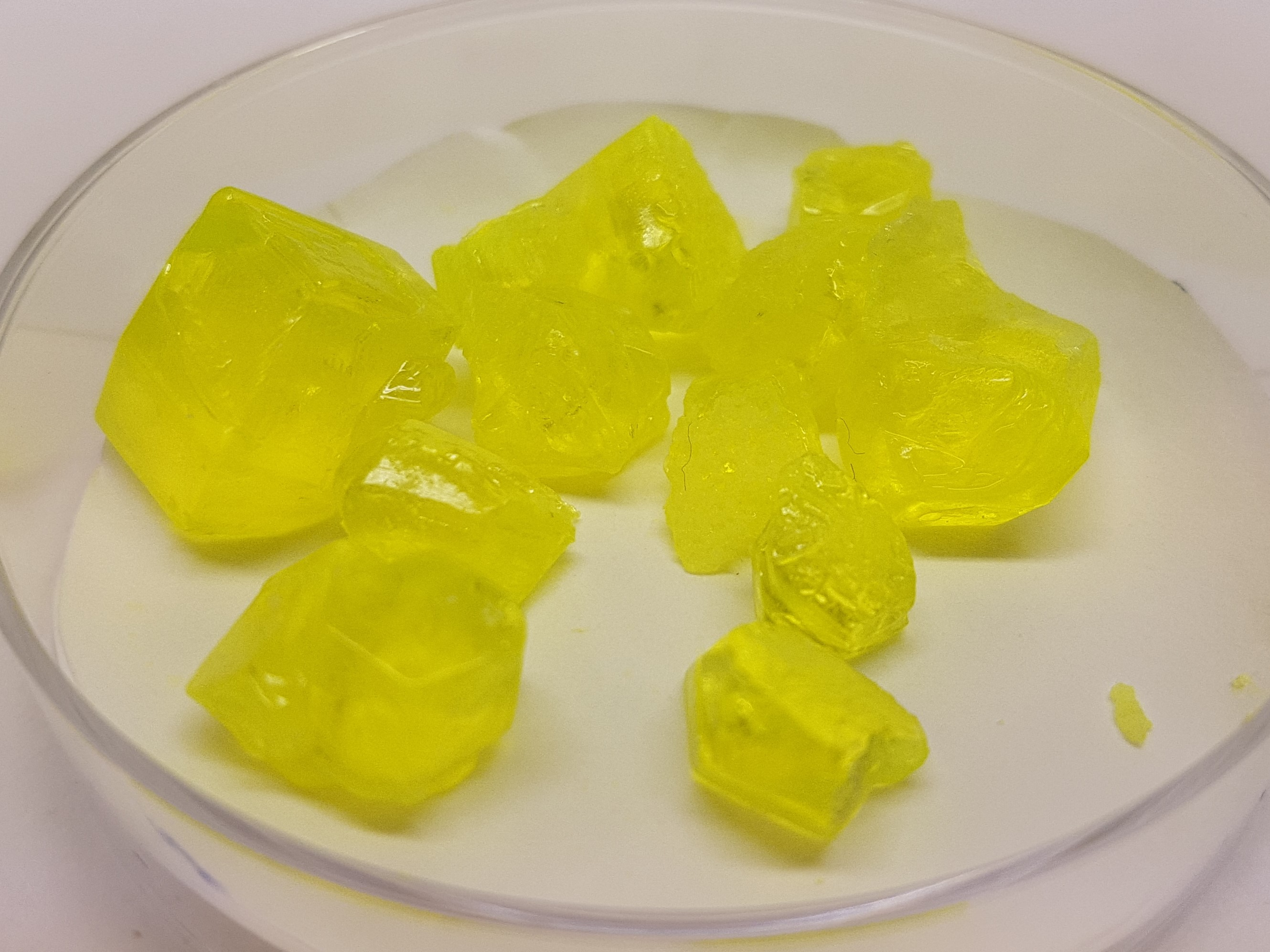
Uranyl nitrate (UO_{2}(NO_{3})_{2})

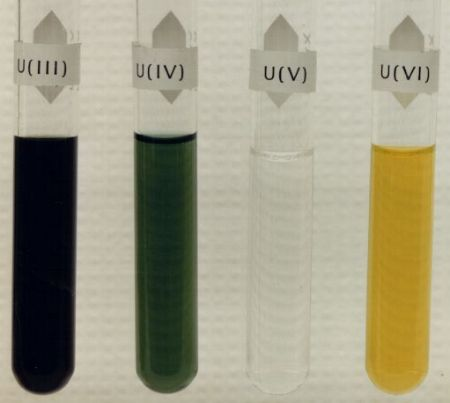
Aqueous solutions of uranium III, IV, V, VI salts

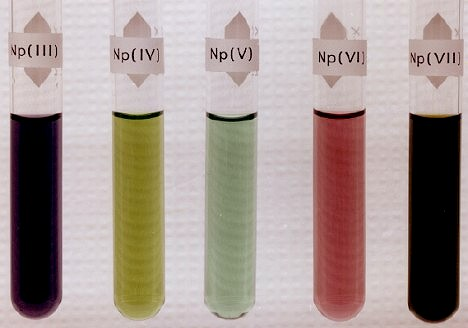
Aqueous solutions of neptunium III, IV, V, VI, VII salts

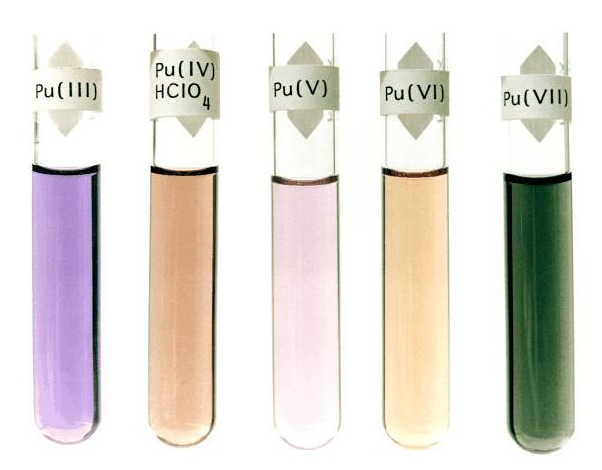
Aqueous solutions of plutonium III, IV, V, VI, VII salts

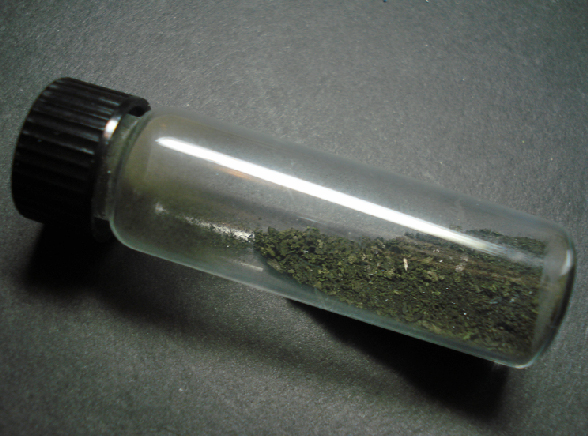
Uranium tetrachloride

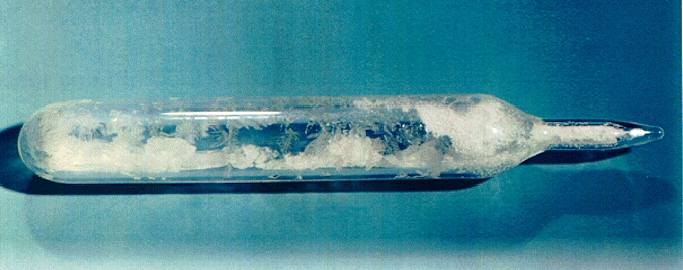
Uranium hexafluoride

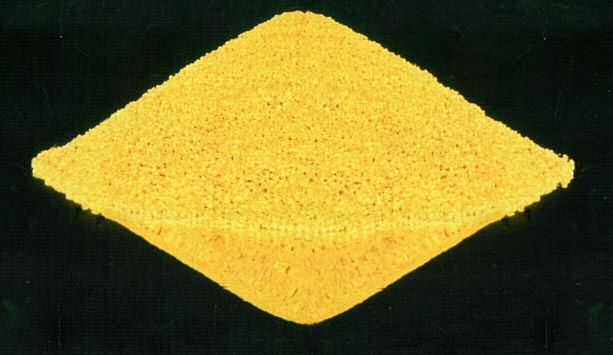
U_{3}O_{8} (yellowcake)

== Compounds ==
=== Oxides and hydroxides ===
Oxides of actinides
| Compound | Color | Crystal symmetry, type | Lattice constants, Å | | | Density, g/cm^{3} | Temperature, °C |
| Compound | Color | Crystal symmetry, type | a | b | c | Density, g/cm^{3} | Temperature, °C |
|---|---|---|---|---|---|---|---|
| Ac_{2}O_{3} | White | Hexagonal, La_{2}O_{3} | 4.07 | - | 6.29 | 9.19 | – |
| PaO_{2} | - | Cubic, CaF_{2} | 5.505 | - | - | - | - |
| Pa_{2}O_{5} | White | cubic, CaF_{2} Cubic; Tetragonal; Hexagonal; Rhombohedral; Orthorhombic | 5.446; 10.891; 5.429; 3.817; 5.425; 6.92 | - - - - - 4.02 | - 10.992; 5.503; 13.22 -: 4. 18 | - | 700; 700–1100; 1000; 1000–1200; 1240–1400 – |
| ThO_{2} | Colorless | Cubic | 5.59 | - | - | 9.87 | – |
| UO_{2} | Black-brown | Cubic | 5.47 | - | - | 10.9 | – |
| NpO_{2} | Greenish-brown | Cubic, CaF_{2} | 5.424 | - | - | 11.1 | – |
| PuO | Black | Cubic, NaCl | 4.96 | - | - | 13.9 | – |
| PuO_{2} | Olive green | Cubic | 5.39 | - | - | 11.44 | – |
| Am_{2}O_{3} | Red-brown; Red-brown | Cubic, Mn_{2}O_{3} Hexagonal, La_{2}O_{3} | 11.03; 3.817 | - | - 5.971 | 10.57; 11.7 | – |
| AmO_{2} | Black | Cubic, CaF_{2} | 5.376 | - | - | - | - |
| Cm_{2}O_{3} | White - - | Cubic, Mn_{2}O_{2} Hexagonal, LaCl_{3} Monoclinic, Sm_{2}O_{3} | 11.01; 3.80; 14.28 | - - 3.65 | - 6; 8.9 | 11.7 | – |
| CmO_{2} | Black | Cubic, CaF_{2} | 5.37 | - | - | - | - |
| Bk_{2}O_{3} | Light brown | Cubic, Mn_{2}O_{3} | 10.886 | - | - | - | - |
| BkO_{2} | Red-brown | Cubic, CaF_{2} | 5.33 | - | - | - | - |
| Cf_{2}O_{3} | Colorless; Yellowish - | Cubic, Mn_{2}O_{3} Monoclinic, Sm_{2}O_{3} Hexagonal, La_{2}O_{3} | 10.79; 14.12; 3.72 | - 3.59 - | - 8.80; 5.96 | - | - |
| CfO_{2} | Black | Cubic | 5.31 | - | - | - | - |
| Es_{2}O_{3} | - | Cubic, Mn_{2}O_{3} Monoclinic; Hexagonal, La_{2}O_{3} | 10.07; 14.1; 3.7 | - 3.59 - | - 8.80; 6 | - | - |

Approximate colors of actinide oxides (most stable are bolded)
| Oxidation state | 89 | 90 | 91 | 92 | 93 | 94 | 95 | 96 | 97 | 98 | 99 |
| +3 | **Ac_{2}O_{3}** | | | | | Pu_{2}O_{3} | Am_{2}O_{3} | **Cm_{2}O_{3}** | Bk_{2}O_{3} | **Cf_{2}O_{3}** | **Es_{2}O_{3}** |
| +4 | | **ThO_{2}** | PaO_{2} | UO_{2} | **NpO_{2}** | **PuO_{2}** | **AmO_{2}** | CmO_{2} | **BkO_{2}** | CfO_{2} | |
| +5 | | | **Pa_{2}O_{5}** | U_{2}O_{5} | Np_{2}O_{5} | | | | | | |
| +5,+6 | | | | **U_{3}O_{8}** | | | | | | | |
| +6 | | | | UO_{3} | | | | | | | |

Dioxides of some actinides
| Chemical formula | ThO_{2} | PaO_{2} | UO_{2} | NpO_{2} | PuO_{2} | AmO_{2} | CmO_{2} | BkO_{2} | CfO_{2} |
| CAS Number | 1314-20-1 | 12036-03-2 | 1344-57-6 | 12035-79-9 | 12059-95-9 | 12005-67-3 | 12016-67-0 | 12010-84-3 | 12015–10–0 |
| Molar mass | 264.04 | 263.035 | 270.03 | 269.047 | 276.063 | 275.06 | 279 | 279.069 | 283.078 |
| Melting point | 3390 °C | 2927 °C | 2865 °C | 2547 °C | 2400 °C | 2175 °C | | | |
| Crystal structure | **An**^{4+}: __ / O^{2−}: __ | | | | | | | | |
| Space group | Fm3̅m | | | | | | | | |
| Coordination number | **An**[8], O[4] | | | | | | | | |

An – actinide

Some actinides can exist in several oxide forms such as An_{2}O_{3}, AnO_{2}, An_{2}O_{5} and AnO_{3}. For all actinides, oxides AnO_{3} are amphoteric and An_{2}O_{3}, AnO_{2} and An_{2}O_{5} are basic, they easily react with water, forming bases:

An_{2}O_{3} + 3 H_{2}O → 2 An(OH)_{3}.

These bases are poorly soluble in water and by their activity are close to the hydroxides of rare-earth metals. Np(OH)_{3} has not yet been synthesized, Pu(OH)_{3} has a blue color while Am(OH)_{3} is pink and Cm(OH)_{3} is colorless. Bk(OH)_{3} and Cf(OH)_{3} are also known, as are tetravalent hydroxides for Np, Pu and Am and pentavalent for Np and Am.

The strongest base is of actinium. All compounds of actinium are colorless, except for black actinium sulfide (Ac_{2}S_{3}). Dioxides of tetravalent actinides crystallize in the cubic system, same as in calcium fluoride.

Thorium reacting with oxygen exclusively forms the dioxide:

$$\ce{Th{} + O2 ->[\ce{1000^\circ C}] \overbrace{ThO2}^{Thorium~dioxide}}$$

Thorium dioxide is a refractory material with the highest melting point among any known oxide (3390 °C). Adding 0.8–1% ThO_{2} to tungsten stabilizes its structure, so the doped filaments have better mechanical stability to vibrations. To dissolve ThO_{2} in acids, it is heated to 500–600 °C; heating above 600 °C produces a very resistant to acids and other reagents form of ThO_{2}. Small addition of fluoride ions catalyses dissolution of thorium dioxide in acids.

Two protactinium oxides have been obtained: PaO_{2} (black) and Pa_{2}O_{5} (white); the former is isomorphic with ThO_{2} and the latter is easier to obtain. Both oxides are basic, and Pa(OH)_{5} is a weak, poorly soluble base.

Decomposition of certain salts of uranium, for example UO_{2}(NO_{3})·6H_{2}O in air at 400 °C, yields orange or yellow UO_{3}. This oxide is amphoteric and forms several hydroxides, the most stable being uranyl hydroxide UO_{2}(OH)_{2}. Reaction of uranium(VI) oxide with hydrogen results in uranium dioxide, which is similar in its properties with ThO_{2}. This oxide is also basic and corresponds to the uranium hydroxide U(OH)_{4}.

Plutonium, neptunium and americium form two basic oxides: An_{2}O_{3} and AnO_{2}. Neptunium trioxide is unstable; thus, only Np_{3}O_{8} could be obtained so far. However, the oxides of plutonium and neptunium with the chemical formula AnO_{2} and An_{2}O_{3} are well characterized.

=== Salts ===
Trichlorides of some actinides
| Chemical formula | AcCl_{3} | UCl_{3} | NpCl_{3} | PuCl_{3} | AmCl_{3} | CmCl_{3} | BkCl_{3} | CfCl_{3} |
| CAS-number | 22986-54-5 | 10025-93-1 | 20737-06-8 | 13569-62-5 | 13464-46-5 | 13537-20-7 | 13536-46-4 | 13536–90–8 |
| Molar mass | 333.386 | 344.387 | 343.406 | 350.32 | 349.42 | 344–358** | 353.428 | 357.438 |
| Melting point | | 837 °C | 800 °C | 767 °C | 715 °C | 695 °C | 603 °C | 545 °C |
| Boiling point | | 1657 °C | | 1767 °C | 850 °C | | | |
| Crystal structure | **An**^{3+}: __ / Cl^{−}: __ | | | | | | | |
| Space group | P6_{3}/m | | | | | | | |
| Coordination number | **An***[9], Cl [3] | | | | | | | |
| Lattice constants | a = 762 pm c = 455 pm | a = 745.2 pm c = 432.8 pm | | a = 739.4 pm c = 424.3 pm | a = 738.2 pm c = 421.4 pm | a = 726 pm c = 414 pm | a = 738.2 pm c = 412.7 pm | a = 738 pm c = 409 pm |

*An – actinide
**Depending on the isotopes

Actinide fluorides
| Compound | Color | Crystal symmetry, type | Lattice constants, Å | | | Density, g/cm^{3} |
| Compound | Color | Crystal symmetry, type | a | b | c | Density, g/cm^{3} |
|---|---|---|---|---|---|---|
| AcF_{3} | White | Hexagonal, LaF_{3} | 4.27 | - | 7.53 | 7.88 |
| PaF_{4} | Dark brown | Monoclinic | 12.7 | 10.7 | 8.42 | – |
| PaF_{5} | Black | Tetragonal, β-UF_{5} | 11.53 | - | 5.19 | – |
| ThF_{4} | Colorless | Monoclinic | 13 | 10.99 | 8.58 | 5.71 |
| UF_{3} | Reddish-purple | Hexagonal | 7.18 | - | 7.34 | 8.54 |
| UF_{4} | Green | Monoclinic | 11.27 | 10.75 | 8.40 | 6.72 |
| α-UF_{5} | Bluish | Tetragonal | 6.52 | - | 4.47 | 5.81 |
| β-UF_{5} | Bluish | Tetragonal | 11.47 | - | 5.20 | 6.45 |
| UF_{6} | Yellowish | Orthorhombic | 9.92 | 8.95 | 5.19 | 5.06 |
| NpF_{3} | Black or purple | Hexagonal | 7.129 | - | 7.288 | 9.12 |
| NpF_{4} | Light green | Monoclinic | 12.67 | 10.62 | 8.41 | 6.8 |
| NpF_{6} | Orange | Orthorhombic | 9.91 | 8.97 | 5.21 | 5 |
| PuF_{3} | Violet-blue | Trigonal | 7.09 | - | 7.25 | 9.32 |
| PuF_{4} | Pale brown | Monoclinic | 12.59 | 10.57 | 8.28 | 6.96 |
| PuF_{6} | Red-brown | Orthorhombic | 9.95 | 9.02 | 3.26 | 4.86 |
| AmF_{3} | Pink or light beige | hexagonal, LaF_{3} | 7.04 | - | 7.255 | 9.53 |
| AmF_{4} | Orange-red | Monoclinic | 12.53 | 10.51 | 8.20 | – |
| CmF_{3} | From brown to white | Hexagonal | 4.041 | - | 7.179 | 9.7 |
| CmF_{4} | Yellow | Monoclinic, UF_{4} | 12.51 | 10.51 | 8.20 | – |
| BkF_{3} | Yellow-green | Trigonal, LaF_{3} Orthorhombic, YF_{3} | 6.97; 6.7 | - 7.09 | 7.14; 4.41 | 10.15; 9.7 |
| BkF_{4} | - | Monoclinic, UF_{4} | 12.47 | 10.58 | 8.17 | – |
| CfF_{3} | - - | Trigonal, LaF_{3} Orthorhombic, YF_{3} | 6. 94; 6.65 | - 7.04 | 7.10; 4.39 | – |
| CfF_{4} | - - | Monoclinic, UF_{4} Monoclinic, UF_{4} | 1.242; 1.233 | 1.047; 1.040 | 8.126; 8.113 | – |

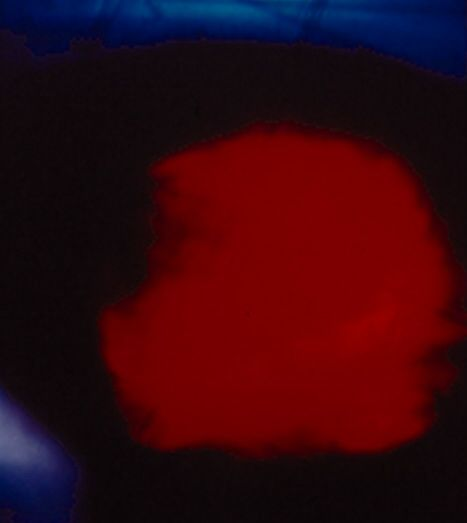
Einsteinium triiodide glowing in the dark

Actinides easily react with halogens forming salts with the formulas MX_{3} and MX_{4} (X = halogen). So the first berkelium compound, BkCl_{3}, was synthesized in 1962 with an amount of 3 nanograms. Like the halogens of rare earth elements, actinide chlorides, bromides, and iodides are water-soluble, and fluorides are insoluble. Uranium easily yields a colorless hexafluoride, which sublimates at a temperature of 56.5 °C; because of its volatility, it is used in the separation of uranium isotopes with gas centrifuge or gaseous diffusion. Actinide hexafluorides have properties close to anhydrides. They are very sensitive to moisture and hydrolyze forming AnO_{2}F_{2}. The pentachloride and black hexachloride of uranium were synthesized, but they are both unstable.

Action of acids on actinides yields salts, and if the acids are non-oxidizing then the actinide in the salt is in low-valence state:

U + 2 H_{2}SO_{4} → U(SO_{4})_{2} + 2 H_{2}
2 Pu + 6 HCl → 2 PuCl_{3} + 3 H_{2}

However, in these reactions the regenerating hydrogen can react with the metal, forming the corresponding hydride. Uranium reacts with acids and water much more easily than thorium.

Actinide salts can also be obtained by dissolving the corresponding hydroxides in acids. Nitrates, chlorides, sulfates and perchlorates of actinides are water-soluble. When crystallizing from aqueous solutions, these salts form hydrates, such as Th(NO_{3})_{4}·6H_{2}O, Th(SO_{4})_{2}·9H_{2}O and Pu_{2}(SO_{4})_{3}·7H_{2}O. Salts of high-valence actinides easily hydrolyze. So, colorless sulfate, chloride, perchlorate and nitrate of thorium transform into basic salts with formulas Th(OH)_{2}SO_{4} and Th(OH)_{3}NO_{3}. The solubility and insolubility of trivalent and tetravalent actinides is like that of lanthanide salts. So phosphates, fluorides, oxalates, iodates and carbonates of actinides are weakly soluble in water; they precipitate as hydrates, such as ThF_{4}·3H_{2}O and Th(CrO_{4})_{2}·3H_{2}O.

Actinides with oxidation state +6, except for the AnO_{2}^{2+}-type cations, form [AnO_{4}]^{2−}, [An_{2}O_{7}]^{2−} and other complex anions. For example, uranium, neptunium and plutonium form salts of the Na_{2}UO_{4} (uranate) and (NH_{4})_{2}U_{2}O_{7} (diuranate) types. In comparison with lanthanides, actinides more easily form coordination compounds, and this ability increases with the actinide valence. Trivalent actinides do not form fluoride coordination compounds, whereas tetravalent thorium forms K_{2}ThF_{6}, KThF_{5}, and even K_{5}ThF_{9} complexes. Thorium also forms the corresponding sulfates (for example Na_{2}SO_{4}·Th(SO_{4})_{2}·5H_{2}O), nitrates and thiocyanates. Salts with the general formula An_{2}Th(NO_{3})_{6}·nH_{2}O are of coordination nature, with the coordination number of thorium equal to 12. Even easier is to produce complex salts of pentavalent and hexavalent actinides. The most stable coordination compounds of actinides – tetravalent thorium and uranium – are obtained in reactions with diketones, e.g. acetylacetone.

== Applications ==
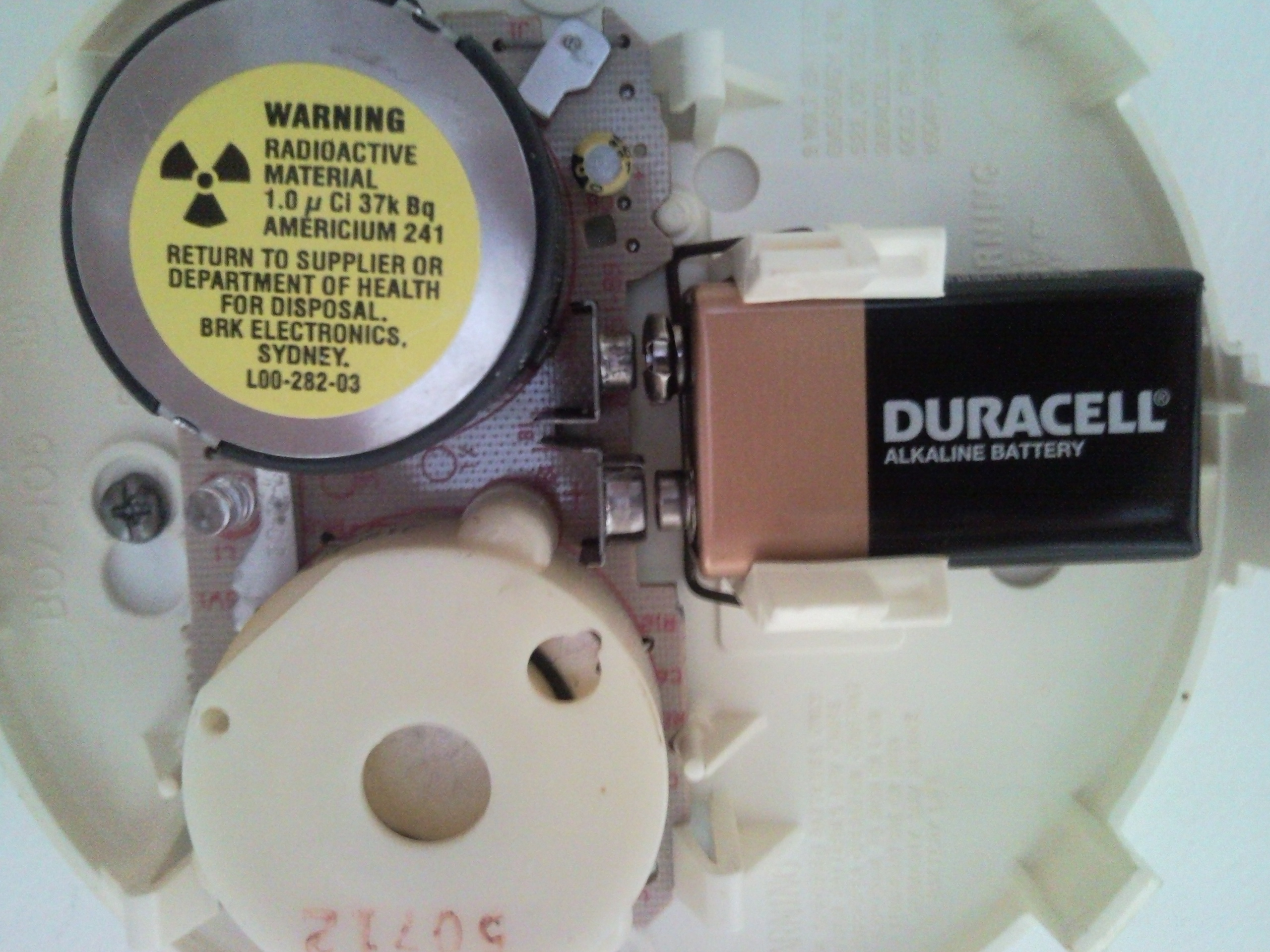
Interior of a smoke detector containing americium-241.

While actinides have some established daily-life applications, such as in smoke detectors (americium) and gas mantles (thorium), they are mostly used in nuclear weapons and as fuel in nuclear reactors. The last two areas exploit the property of actinides to release enormous energy in nuclear reactions, which under certain conditions may become self-sustaining chain reactions.

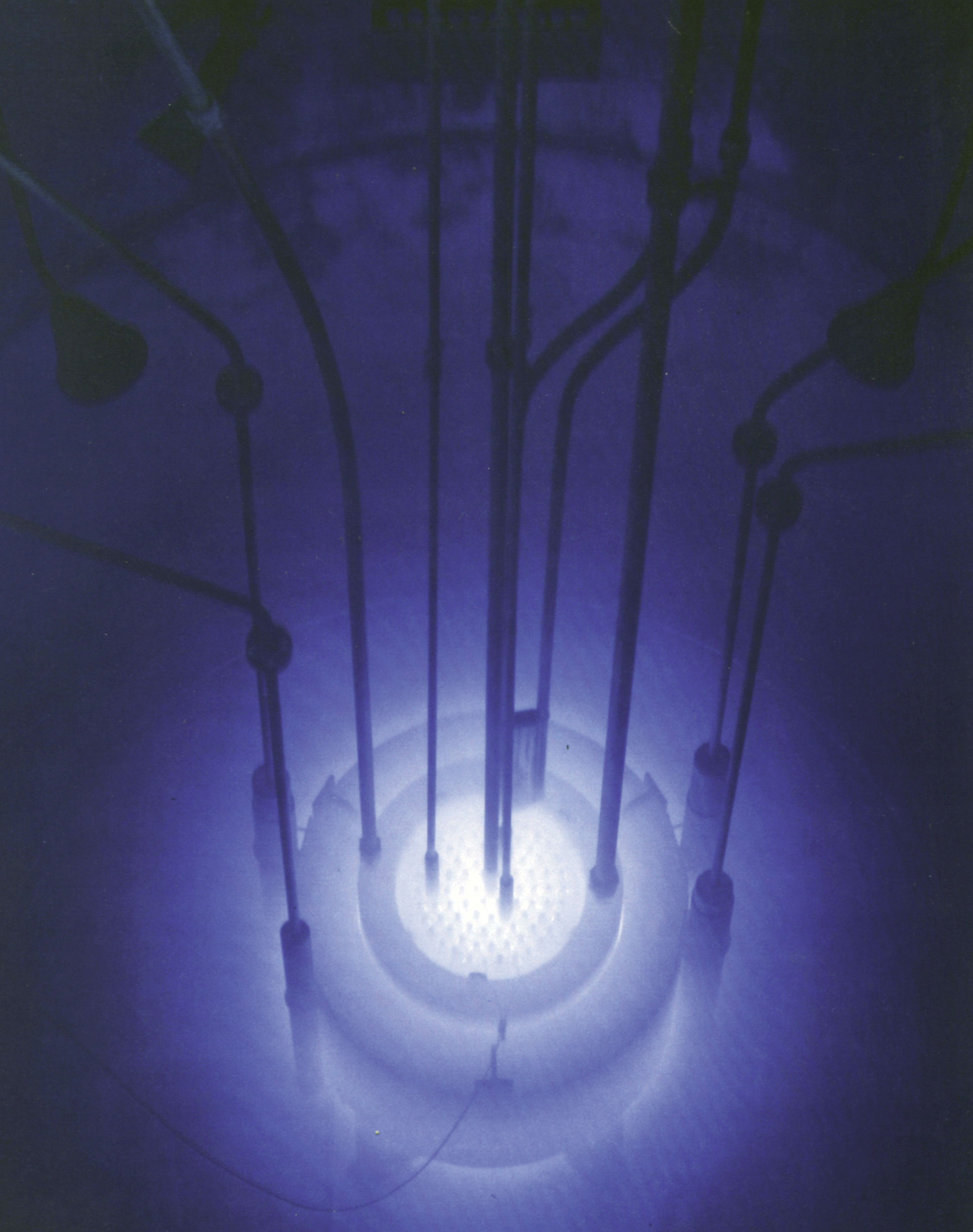
Self-illumination of a nuclear reactor by Cherenkov radiation.

The most important isotope for nuclear power applications is uranium-235. It is used in the thermal reactor, and its concentration in natural uranium does not exceed 0.72%. This isotope strongly absorbs thermal neutrons releasing much energy. One fission act of 1 gram of ^{235}U converts into about 1 MW·day. Of importance, is that ^{235}_{92}U emits more neutrons than it absorbs; upon reaching the critical mass, ^{235}_{92}U enters into a self-sustaining chain reaction. Typically, uranium nucleus is divided into two fragments with the release of 2–3 neutrons, for example:

^{235}_{92}U + ^{1}_{0}n ⟶ ^{115}_{45}Rh + ^{118}_{47}Ag + 3^{1}_{0}n

Other promising actinide isotopes for nuclear power are thorium-232 and its product from the thorium fuel cycle, uranium-233.

Nuclear reactor
The core of most Generation II nuclear reactors contains a set of hollow metal rods, usually made of zirconium alloys, filled with solid nuclear fuel pellets – mostly oxide, carbide, nitride or monosulfide of uranium, plutonium or thorium, or their mixture (the so-called MOX fuel). The most common fuel is oxide of uranium-235.

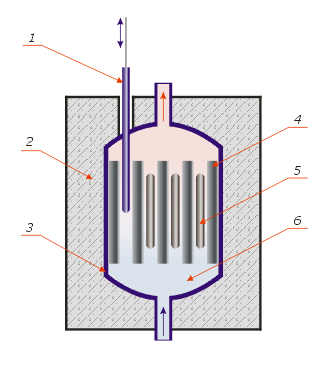
Nuclear reactor scheme

Fast neutrons are slowed by moderators, which contain water, carbon, deuterium, or beryllium, as thermal neutrons to increase the efficiency of their interaction with uranium-235. The rate of nuclear reaction is controlled by introducing additional rods made of boron or cadmium or a liquid absorbent, usually boric acid. Reactors for plutonium production are called breeder reactor or breeders; they have a different design and use fast neutrons.

Emission of neutrons during the fission of uranium is important not only for maintaining the nuclear chain reaction, but also for the synthesis of the heavier actinides. Uranium-239 converts via β-decay into plutonium-239, which, like uranium-235, is capable of spontaneous fission. The world's first nuclear reactors were built not for energy, but for producing plutonium-239 for nuclear weapons.

About half of produced thorium is used as the light-emitting material of gas mantles. Thorium is also added into multicomponent alloys of magnesium and zinc. Mg-Th alloys are light and strong, but also have high melting point and ductility and thus are widely used in the aviation industry and in the production of missiles. Thorium also has good electron emission properties, with long lifetime and low potential barrier for the emission. The relative content of thorium and uranium isotopes is widely used to estimate the age of various objects, including stars (see radiometric dating).

The major application of plutonium has been in nuclear weapons, where the isotope plutonium-239 was a key component due to its ease of fission and availability. Plutonium-based designs allow reducing the critical mass to about a third of that for uranium-235. The "Fat Man"-type plutonium bombs produced during the Manhattan Project used explosive compression of plutonium to obtain significantly higher densities than normal, combined with a central neutron source to begin the reaction and increase efficiency. Thus only 6.2 kg of plutonium was needed for an explosive yield equivalent to 20 kilotons of TNT. (See also Nuclear weapon design.) Hypothetically, as little as 4 kg of plutonium—and maybe even less—could be used to make a single atomic bomb using very sophisticated assembly designs.

Plutonium-238 is potentially more efficient isotope for nuclear reactors, since it has smaller critical mass than uranium-235, but it continues to release much thermal energy (0.56 W/g) by decay even when the fission chain reaction is stopped by control rods. Its application is limited by its high price (about US$1000/g). This isotope has been used in thermopiles and water distillation systems of some space satellites and stations. The Galileo and Apollo spacecraft (e.g. Apollo 14) had heaters powered by kilogram quantities of plutonium-238 oxide; this heat is also transformed into electricity with thermopiles. The decay of plutonium-238 produces relatively harmless alpha particles and is not accompanied by gamma rays. Therefore, this isotope (~160 mg) is used as the energy source in heart pacemakers where it lasts about 5 times longer than conventional batteries.

Actinium-227 is used as a neutron source. Its high specific energy (14.5 W/g) and the possibility of obtaining significant quantities of thermally stable compounds are attractive for use in long-lasting thermoelectric generators for remote use. ^{228}Ac is used as an indicator of radioactivity in chemical research, as it emits high-energy electrons (2.18 MeV) that can be easily detected. ^{228}Ac-^{228}Ra mixtures are widely used as an intense gamma-source in industry and medicine.

Development of self-glowing actinide-doped materials with durable crystalline matrices is a new area of actinide utilization as the addition of alpha-emitting radionuclides to some glasses and crystals may confer luminescence.

== Toxicity ==
Schematic illustration of penetration of radiation through sheets of paper, aluminium and lead brick

Periodic table with elements colored according to the half-life of their most stable isotope.

Radioactive substances can harm human health via (i) local skin contamination, (ii) internal exposure due to ingestion of radioactive isotopes, and (iii) external overexposure by β-activity and γ-radiation. Together with radium and transuranium elements, actinium is one of the most dangerous radioactive poisons with high specific α-activity. The most important feature of actinium is its ability to accumulate and remain in the surface layer of skeletons. At the initial stage of poisoning, actinium accumulates in the liver. Another danger of actinium is that it undergoes radioactive decay faster than being excreted. Adsorption from the digestive tract is much smaller (~0.05%) for actinium than radium.

Protactinium in the body tends to accumulate in the kidneys and bones. The maximum safe dose of protactinium in the human body is 0.03 μCi that corresponds to 0.5 micrograms of ^{231}Pa. This isotope, which might be present in the air as aerosol, is 2.5×10^{8} times more toxic than hydrocyanic acid.

Plutonium, when entering the body through air, food or blood (e.g. a wound), mostly settles in the lungs, liver and bones with only about 10% going to other organs, and remains there for decades. The long residence time of plutonium in the body is partly explained by its poor solubility in water. Some isotopes of plutonium emit ionizing α-radiation, which damages the surrounding cells. The median lethal dose (LD_{50}) for 30 days in dogs after intravenous injection of plutonium is 0.32 milligram per kg of body mass, and thus the lethal dose for humans is approximately 22 mg for a person weighing 70 kg; the amount for respiratory exposure should be approximately four times greater. Another estimate assumes that plutonium is 50 times less toxic than radium, and thus permissible content of plutonium in the body should be 5 μg or 0.3 μCi. Such amount is nearly invisible under microscope. After trials on animals, this maximum permissible dose was reduced to 0.65 μg or 0.04 μCi. Studies on animals also revealed that the most dangerous plutonium exposure route is through inhalation, after which 5–25% of inhaled substances is retained in the body. Depending on the particle size and solubility of the plutonium compounds, plutonium is localized either in the lungs or in the lymphatic system, or is absorbed in the blood and then transported to the liver and bones. Contamination via food is the least likely way. In this case, only about 0.05% of soluble and 0.01% of insoluble compounds of plutonium absorbs into blood, and the rest is excreted. Exposure of damaged skin to plutonium would retain nearly 100% of it.

Using actinides in nuclear fuel, sealed radioactive sources or advanced materials such as self-glowing crystals has many potential benefits. However, a serious concern is the extremely high radiotoxicity of actinides and their migration in the environment. Use of chemically unstable forms of actinides in MOX and sealed radioactive sources is not appropriate by modern safety standards. There is a challenge to develop stable and durable actinide-bearing materials, which provide safe storage, use and final disposal. A key need is application of actinide solid solutions in durable crystalline host phases.

== See also ==
- Actinides in the environment
- Lanthanides
- Major actinides
- Minor actinides
- Transuranics

== Bibliography ==
- Golub, A. M. (1971). Общая и неорганическая химия (General and Inorganic Chemistry). Vol. 2.
- Greenwood, Norman N.; Earnshaw, Alan (1997). Chemistry of the Elements (2nd ed.). Butterworth-Heinemann. doi:10.1016/C2009-0-30414-6. ISBN 978-0-08-037941-8.
- Myasoedov, B. (1972). Analytical chemistry of transplutonium elements. Moscow: Nauka. ISBN 978-0-470-62715-0.
