= Thorium chloride =

Thorium chloride may refer to:

- Thorium(II) chloride (thorium dichloride), ThCl_{2}
- Thorium(III) chloride (thorium trichloride), ThCl_{3}
- Thorium(IV) chloride (thorium tetrachloride), ThCl_{4}
