= Thorium(IV) bromide =

Identifiers
| CAS Number | 13453-49-1 anhydrous; 20333-47-5 octahydrate |
| 3D model (JSmol) | Interactive image |
| ChemSpider | 75321 |
| ECHA InfoCard | 100.033.285 |
| EC Number | 236-628-9 |
| PubChem CID | 83483 |
| CompTox Dashboard (EPA) | DTXSID1065473 |
- InChI: InChI=1S/4BrH.Th/h4*1H;/q;;;;+4/p-4 Key: OMDXFCRSKHYDTM-UHFFFAOYSA-J
- SMILES: Br[Th](Br)(Br)Br

Properties
| Chemical formula | ThBr_{4} |
| Molar mass | 551.65 |
| Appearance | white solid |
| Density | 5.72 g·cm^{−3} (α); 5.76 g·cm^{−3} (β) |
| Melting point | 678±5 °C |
| Solubility in water | soluble |
- Except where otherwise noted, data are given for materials in their standard state (at 25 °C [77 °F], 100 kPa). Infobox references

Thorium(IV) bromide is an inorganic compound, with the chemical formula of ThBr_{4}.

== Preparation ==
Thorium(IV) bromide can be obtained by reacting thorium dioxide, bromine and carbon at 800~900 °C. This method produces a mixture of alpha and beta forms of thorium bromide. The pure α-form product is obtained by heating the mixture at 330~375 °C for a long time. The pure β form is obtained by heating the product to 470 °C and then rapidly cooling it in ice water.

ThO_{2} + 2 C + 2 Br_{2} ⟶ ThBr_{4} + 2 CO

Thorium(IV) bromide can also be produced by the reaction of thorium and bromine. Thorium hydroxide reacts with hydrobromic acid to crystallize hydrates from the solution.

== Properties ==
Thorium(IV) bromide exists in low-temperature α-type and high-temperature β-type. They are both white deliquescent solids and are easily soluble in water, ethanol and ethyl acetate. It reacts with fluorine gas under standard conditions and with chlorine or oxygen when heated. The beta form of thorium bromide is metastable at room temperature and converts to the alpha form over 10 to 12 weeks, with the conversion from alpha to beta occurring at around 420 °C. The α-type thorium(IV) bromide is an orthorhombic crystal, while the β-type thorium(IV) bromide is a tetragonal crystal with space group I4_{1}/amd. Some of its hydrates are known, and these hydrates form thorium oxybromide on heating.

== External reading ==
- Mikheev, N. B.; Kamenskaya, A. N.; Kulyukhin, S. A.; Rumer, I. A.; Novichenko, V. L. (2001). "Sorption of CH3131I from the Gas Phase on Modified Metal-Substituted Zeolites Containing Copper and Silver Ions". Radiochemistry. 43 (3): 293–296. Bibcode:2001Radch..43..293M. doi:10.1023/a:1012868726987. ISSN 1066-3622. S2CID 92635246.
