= Thorium trichloride =

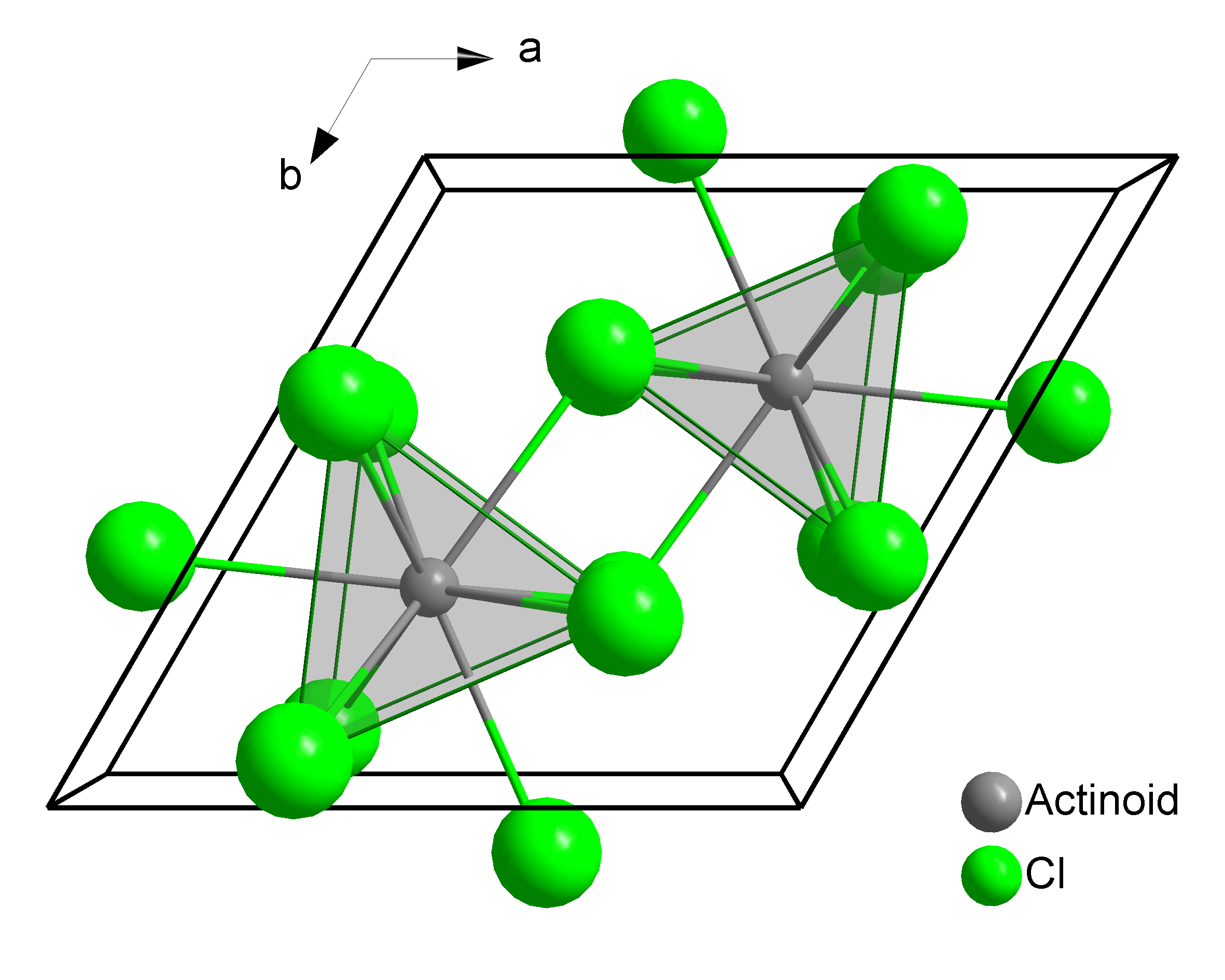

Names
- IUPAC name Trichlorothorium
- Other names Thorium(III) chloride

Identifiers
CAS Number	15123-26-9
3D model (JSmol)	Interactive image
ChemSpider	123372
PubChem CID	139894 (charge error)
CompTox Dashboard (EPA)	DTXSID90164741
- InChI: InChI=1S/3ClH.Th/h3*1H;/q;;;+3/p-3 Key: LQPUBIDKGBFLMP-UHFFFAOYSA-K
- SMILES: Cl[Th](Cl)Cl

Properties
Chemical formula	Cl_{3}Th
Molar mass	338.39 g·mol^{−1}
Appearance	crystals

Related compounds
Related compounds	Americium trichloride, uranium trichloride
- Except where otherwise noted, data are given for materials in their standard state (at 25 °C [77 °F], 100 kPa). Infobox references

Thorium trichloride is a binary inorganic compound of thorium metal and chlorine with the chemical formula ThCl_{3}.

== Synthesis ==
The compound can be prepared by reducing thorium tetrachloride at 800 °C:

3Th + ThCl_{4} → 4ThCl_{3}

Also a reaction of both elements:

2Th + 3Cl_{2} → 2ThCl_{3}

Other reactions are also known.

== Physical properties ==
The compound forms crystals of the uranium trichloride crystal system.

== Chemical properties ==
Above 630 °C thorium trichloride dissociates into the dichloride and tetrachloride.

== Uses ==
Thorium trichloride is supposed to be used in a dual fluid reactor as reactor fuel.
