= Thorium(IV) nitrate =

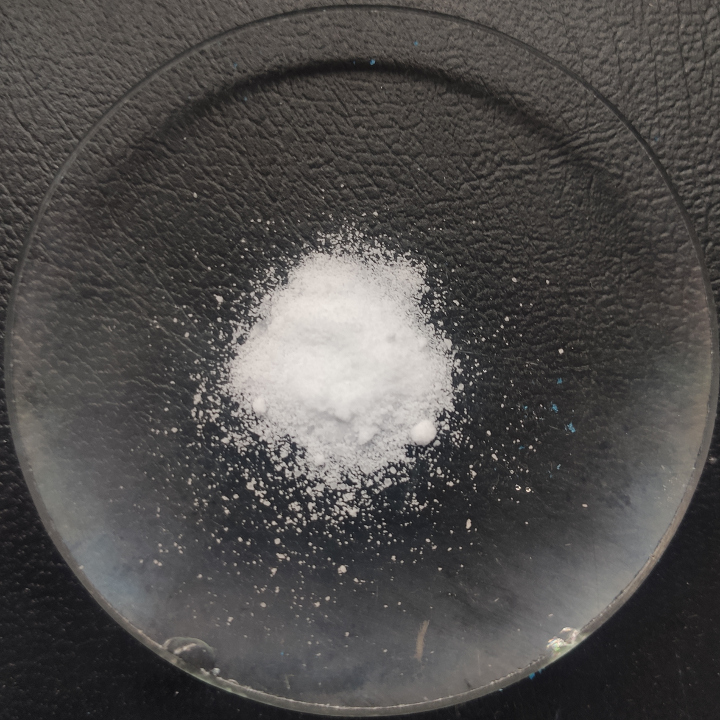

Identifiers
CAS Number	(anhydrous): 13823-29-5; (trihydrate): 87174-21-8; (tetrahydrate): 13470-07-0; (pentahydrate): 14767-04-5; (hexahydrate): 23739-44-8
3D model (JSmol)	(anhydrous): Interactive image; (tetrahydrate): Interactive image; (pentahydrate): Interactive image; (hexahydrate): Interactive image
ChemSpider	(anhydrous): 24497
ECHA InfoCard	100.034.090
EC Number	(anhydrous): 237-514-1
PubChem CID	(anhydrous): 26293; (tetrahydrate): 134672; (pentahydrate): 92043287; (hexahydrate): 129688133
UNII	(anhydrous): IF944P467K; (tetrahydrate): 66RXJ6ZF36
CompTox Dashboard (EPA)	(anhydrous): DTXSID4065656
- InChI: (anhydrous): InChI=1S/4NO3.Th/c4*2-1(3)4;/q4*-1;+4 Key: VGBPIHVLVSGJGR-UHFFFAOYSA-N; (tetrahydrate): InChI=1S/4NO3.4H2O.Th/c4*2-1(3)4;;;;;/h;;;;4*1H2;/q4*-1;;;;;+4 Key: VAVIMIAZQDNXID-UHFFFAOYSA-N; (pentahydrate): InChI=1S/4NO3.5H2O.Th/c4*2-1(3)4;;;;;;/h;;;;5*1H2;/q4*-1;;;;;;+4 Key: JFVMRMIHIHCMDY-UHFFFAOYSA-N; (hexahydrate): InChI=1S/4NO3.6H2O.Th/c4*2-1(3)4;;;;;;;/h;;;;6*1H2;/q4*-1;;;;;;;+4 Key: HLGOSPFVTORIQZ-UHFFFAOYSA-N
- SMILES: (anhydrous): [N+](=O)([O-])[O-].[N+](=O)([O-])[O-].[N+](=O)([O-])[O-].[N+](=O)([O-])[O-].[Th+4]; (tetrahydrate): [N+](=O)([O-])[O-].[N+](=O)([O-])[O-].[N+](=O)([O-])[O-].[N+](=O)([O-])[O-].O.O.O.O.[Th+4]; (pentahydrate): [N+](=O)([O-])[O-].[N+](=O)([O-])[O-].[N+](=O)([O-])[O-].[N+](=O)([O-])[O-].O.O.O.O.O.[Th+4]; (hexahydrate): [N+](=O)([O-])[O-].[N+](=O)([O-])[O-].[N+](=O)([O-])[O-].[N+](=O)([O-])[O-].O.O.O.O.O.O.[Th+4]

Properties
Chemical formula	Th(NO_{3})_{4}
Molar mass	480.066 (anhydrous); 552.130 (tetrahydrate); 570.146 (pentahydrate)
Appearance	Colorless crystal
Density	2.8 g/cm^{3}
Melting point	55 °C (131 °F; 328 K)
Boiling point	Decomposes
Solubility in water	4.013 mol/L at (25 °C (77 °F; 298 K))
Solubility	alcohols, ketones, esters and ethers
Vapor pressure	0.7 torrs (93 Pa) (25 °C (77 °F; 298 K)); 1.2 torrs (160 Pa) (42 °C (108 °F; 315 K)); 10.7 torrs (1.43 kPa) (68 °C (154 °F; 341 K))

Structure
Crystal structure	orthorhombic
Lattice constant	a = 1.1191 nm, b = 2.2889 nm, c = 1.0579 nm (pentahydrate)

Thermochemistry
Heat capacity (C)	480.83 J/(K·mol)
Std enthalpy of formation (Δ_{f}H^{⦵}_{298})	−2.29 kJ/(K·mol)

Hazards
- GHS labelling
Pictograms	(GHS03: Oxidizing) (GHS07: Exclamation mark) (GHS08: Health hazard) (GHS09: Environmental hazard)
Signal word	Warning
Hazard statements	H272, H302, H315, H319, H335, H373, H411
Precautionary statements	P210, P220, P221, P260, P264, P270, P271, P273, P280, P301+P312, P302+P352, P304+P340, P305+P351+P338, P312, P314, P321, P330, P332+P313, P337+P313, P362, P370+P378, P391, P403+P233, P405, P501
- Except where otherwise noted, data are given for materials in their standard state (at 25 °C [77 °F], 100 kPa). Infobox references

Thorium(IV) nitrate is a chemical compound, a salt of thorium and nitric acid with the formula Th(NO_{3})_{4}. A white solid in its anhydrous form, it can form tetra- and pentahydrates. As a salt of thorium it is weakly radioactive.

== Preparation ==
Thorium(IV) nitrate hydrate can be prepared by the reaction of thorium(IV) hydroxide and nitric acid:

Th(OH)_{4} + 4 HNO_{3} + 3 H_{2}O → Th(NO_{3})_{4} + 5 H_{2}O

Different hydrates are produced by crystallizing in different conditions. When a solution is very dilute, the nitrate is hydrolysed. Although various hydrates have been reported over the years, and some suppliers even claim to stock them, only the tetrahydrate and pentahydrate actually exist. (Note: Bogus hydrates include 12, 6, 5.5, 2 and 1 water molecules) What is called a hexahydrate, crystallized from a neutral solution, is probably a basic salt.

The pentahydrate is the most common form. It is crystallized from dilute nitric acid solution.

The tetrahydrate, Th(NO_{3})_{4}·4H_{2}O is formed by crystallizing from a stronger nitric acid solution. Concentrations of nitric acid from 4 to 59% result in the tetrahydrate forming. The thorium atom has 12-coordination, with four bidentate nitrate groups and four water molecules attached to each thorium atom.

To obtain the anhydrous thorium(IV) nitrate, thermal decomposition of Th(NO_{3})_{4}·2N_{2}O_{5} is required. The decomposition occurs at 150–160 °C (302–320 °F).

== Properties ==
Anhydrous thorium nitrate is a white substance. It is covalently bound with low melting point of 55 °C (131 °F).

The pentahydrate Th(NO_{3})_{4}·5H_{2}O crystallizes with clear colourless crystals in the orthorhombic system. Each thorium atom is connected twice to each of four bidentate nitrate groups, and to three water molecules via their oxygen atoms. In total the thorium is eleven-coordinated. There are also two other water molecules in the crystal structure.The water is hydrogen bonded to other water, or to nitrate groups.

Thorium nitrate can dissolve in several different organic solvents including alcohols, ketones, esters and ethers. This can be used to separate different metals such as the lanthanides. With ammonium nitrate in the aqueous phase, thorium nitrate prefers the organic liquid, and the lanthanides stay with the water.

Thorium nitrate dissolved in water lowers it freezing point. The maximum freezing point depression is −37 °C (−35 °F) with a concentration of 2.9 mol/kg.

== Reactions ==
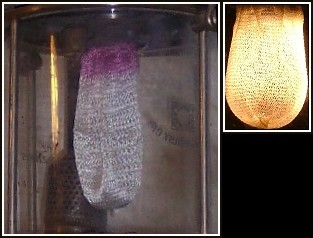
Thorium(IV) nitrate used in a lamp.

When thorium nitrate pentahydrate is heated, nitrates with less water are produced, however the compounds also lose some nitrate. At 140 °C (284 °F) a basic nitrate, ThO(NO_{3})_{2} is produced. When strongly heated thorium dioxide is produced.

A polymeric peroxynitrate is precipitated when hydrogen peroxide combines with thorium nitrate in solution with dilute nitric acid. Its formula is Th_{6}(O_{2})_{10}(NO_{3})_{4}·10H_{2}O.

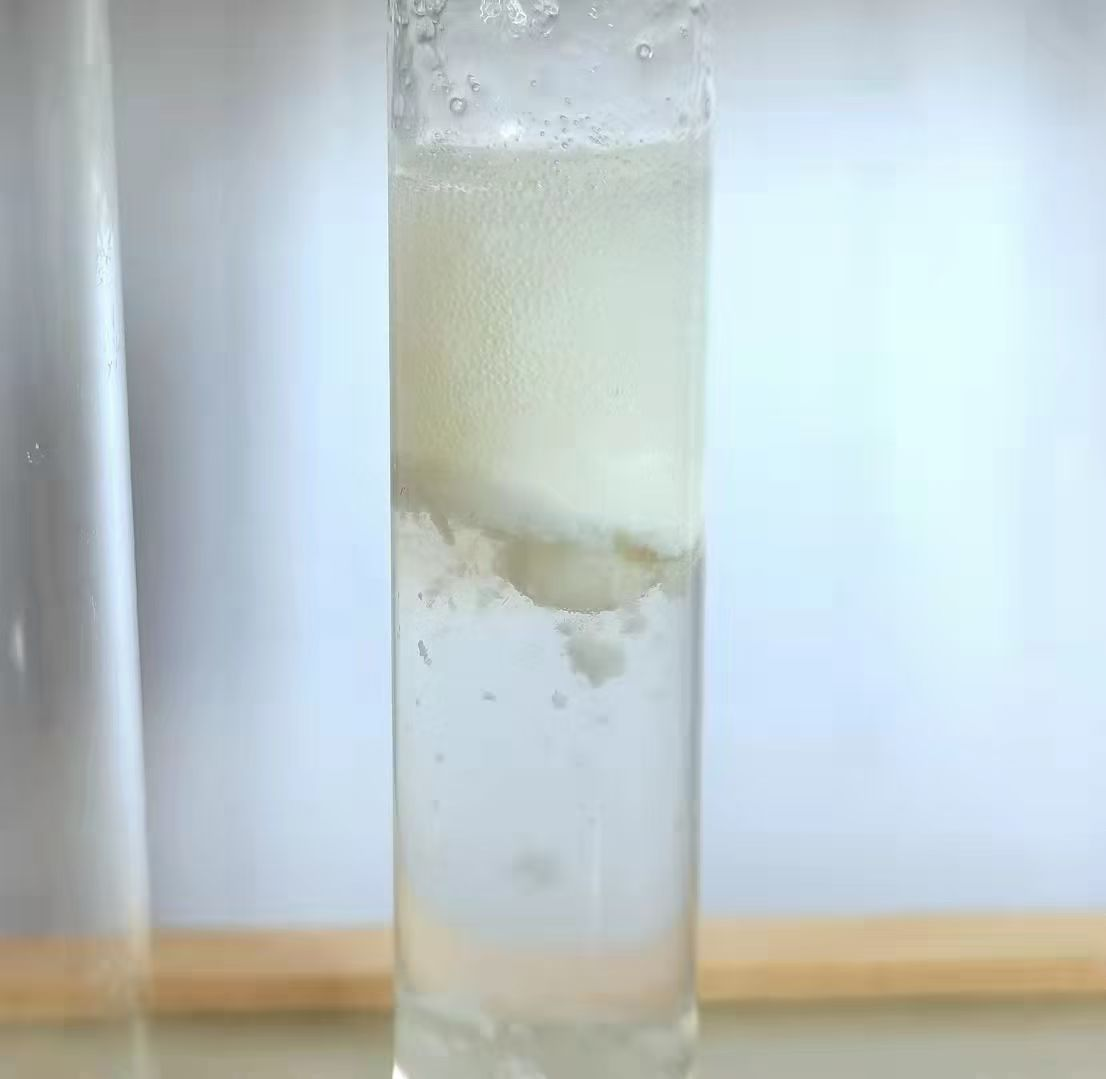
Th_{6}(OO)_{10}(NO_{3})_{4}·10H_{2}O is precipitated by the reaction of thorium nitrate aqueous solution with hydrogen peroxide

The hydrolysis of thorium nitrate solutions produces basic nitrates Th_{2}(OH)_{4}(NO_{3})_{4}·xH_{2}O and Th_{2}(OH)_{2}(NO_{3})_{6}·8H_{2}O. In crystals of Th_{2}(OH)_{2}(NO_{3})_{6}·8H_{2}O a pair of thorium atoms are connected by two bridging oxygen atoms. Each thorium atom is surrounded by three bidentate nitrate groups and three water molecules, bringing the coordination number to 11.

When oxalic acid is added to a thorium nitrate solution, insoluble thorium oxalate precipitates. Other organic acids added to thorium nitrate solution produce precipitates of organic salts with citric acid; basic salts, such as tartaric acid, adipic acid, malic acid, gluconic acid, phenylacetic acid, valeric acid. Other precipitates are also formed from sebacic acid and azelaic acid

== Double salts ==
Hexanitratothorates with the generic formula M_{2}^{I}Th(NO_{3})_{6} or M^{II}Th(NO_{3})_{6}·8H_{2}O are made by mixing other metal nitrates with thorium nitrate in dilute nitric acid solution. M^{II} can be Mg, Mn, Co, Ni, or Zn. M^{I} can be Cs, (NO)^{+} or (NO_{2})^{+}. Crystals of the divalent metal thorium hexanitrate octahydrate have a monoclinic form with similar unit cell dimensions: β=97°, a=9.08 b=8.75-8 c=12.61-3. Pentanitratothorates with the generic formula M^{I}Th(NO_{3})_{5}·xH_{2}O are known for M^{I} being Na or K.

K_{3}Th(NO_{3})_{7} and K_{3}H_{3}Th(NO_{3})_{10}·4H_{2}O are also known.

== Complexed salts ==
Thorium nitrate also crystallizes with other ligands and organic solvates including ethylene glycol diethyl ether, tri(n-butyl)phosphate, butylamine, dimethylamine, and trimethylphosphine oxide.
