= Thorium dichloride =

Names
- Other names Thorium(II) chloride, thorium(2+) dichloride

Identifiers
CAS Number	15230-70-3
3D model (JSmol)	Interactive image
ChemSpider	123389
PubChem CID	57348780
CompTox Dashboard (EPA)	DTXSID40164993
- InChI: InChI=1S/2ClH.Th/h2*1H;/q;;+2/p-2 Key: RSJXAFQOOZXJLX-UHFFFAOYSA-L
- SMILES: [Th+2].[Cl-].[Cl-]

Properties
Chemical formula	Cl_{2}Th
Molar mass	302.94 g·mol^{−1}

Related compounds
Related compounds	Americium dichloride, Einsteinium dichloride
- Except where otherwise noted, data are given for materials in their standard state (at 25 °C [77 °F], 100 kPa). Infobox references

Thorium dichloride is a binary inorganic compound of thorium metal and chloride with the chemical formula ThCl_{2}.

== Synthesis ==
Th-metal is dissolved in alkali chloride. Thorium tetrachloride melts up to ThCl_{2}.
