= Major actinide =

Plutonium and uranium present in nuclear fuel

Major actinides is a term used in the nuclear power industry that refers to the isotopes of plutonium (239 Pu) uranium (235 U, 238 U) and thorium (232 Th) present in nuclear fuel, as opposed to the minor actinides neptunium, americium, curium, berkelium, and californium, including other isotopes of uranium and plutonium and other actinides.
