= Thorium(IV) sulfate =

Names
- IUPAC name Thorium(IV) sulfate

Identifiers
CAS Number	10381-37-0 anhydrous; 7446-30-2 nonahydrate
3D model (JSmol)	Interactive image
ChemSpider	141391
ECHA InfoCard	100.030.756
EC Number	233-845-0
PubChem CID	160939
UNII	S0Z2E2190J
CompTox Dashboard (EPA)	DTXSID00890660
- InChI: InChI=1S/2H2O4S.Th/c2*1-5(2,3)4;/h2*(H2,1,2,3,4);/q;;+4/p-4 Key: RUJLHPZAKCVICY-UHFFFAOYSA-J
- SMILES: [O-]S(=O)(=O)[O-].[O-]S(=O)(=O)[O-].[Th+4]

Properties
Chemical formula	Th(SO_{4})_{2}
Molar mass	424.168 g/mol
Appearance	White hygroscopic crystals (anhydrous)
Solubility in water	per 100 g water: 33 g (anhydrous, 0 °C); 4.2 g (nonahydrate); 1.57 g (nonahydrate, 20 °C); 6.76 g (nonahydrate, 55 °C)

Related compounds
Related compounds	Cerium(IV) sulfate
- Except where otherwise noted, data are given for materials in their standard state (at 25 °C [77 °F], 100 kPa). Infobox references

Thorium(IV) sulfate is an inorganic compound with the chemical formula Th(SO_{4})_{2}.

== Properties ==
Thorium(IV) sulfate forms several hydrates, including the dihydrate, tetrahydrate, octahydrate and nonahydrate. The dihydrate occurs as an intermediate in the dehydration of higher hydrates, while the crystal structure of the octahydrate has been determined.

In very dilute aqueous solution, thorium(IV) sulfate can hydrolyse to form the basic sulfate Th(OH)_{2}SO_{4}.

== Preparation ==
Thorium(IV) sulfate can be prepared by reacting hydrated thorium dioxide with sulfuric acid.
