= Gregory Robert Choppin =

American chemist (1927–2015)

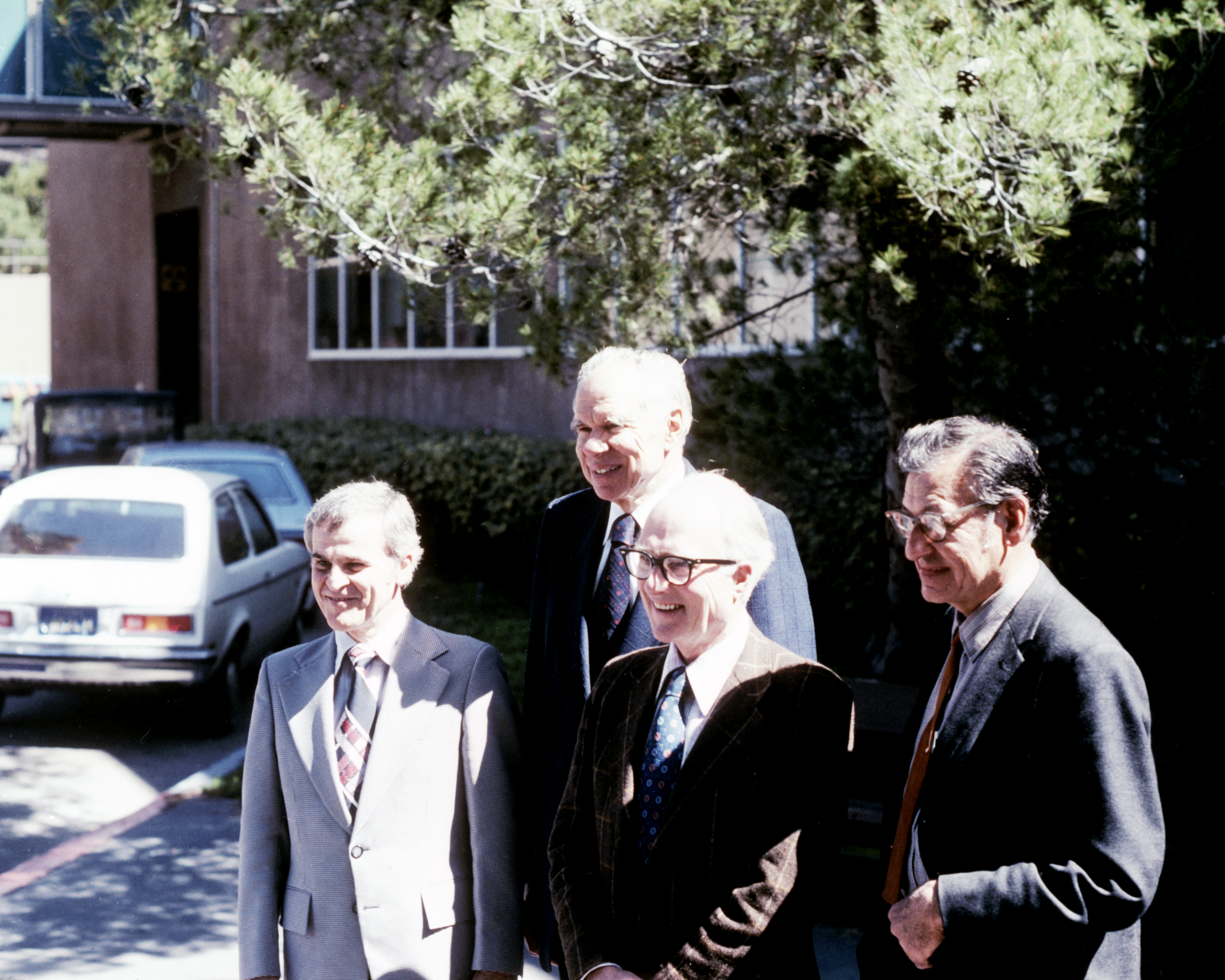
Choppin celebrating the 25th anniversary of the discovery of mendelevium with Ghiorso, Harvey, and Seaborg in 1980.

Gregory Robert Choppin (November 9, 1927, Texas, United States – October 21, 2015, Tallahassee, Florida) was an American nuclear chemist and co-discoverer of the element mendelevium, atomic number 101. Others in the discovery group were Albert Ghiorso, Bernard G. Harvey, Stanley G. Thompson, and Glenn T. Seaborg. The element was named in honor of Dmitri Mendeleev.

Choppin received a Bachelor of Science degree in chemistry at Loyola University New Orleans and earned his doctorate in chemistry at the University of Texas in 1953. He then worked as a postdoctoral researcher at the University of California, Berkeley, from 1953 to 1956.

While at Berkeley he co-discovered mendelevium. Video documentation of the discovery was produced by the television station KQED and can be viewed on YouTube with a new narration by Claude Lyneis.

He taught at Florida State University from 1956 until 2001. He served there as Chair of the Department of Chemistry and Biochemistry and was named Robert O. Lawton Distinguished Professor, "...the highest honor the Florida State faculty bestows upon one of its own."

The chemistry wing of the science building at Loyola University is named for Choppin, and the Gregory R. Choppin Chair in Chemistry and Biochemistry is an endowed chair at Florida State University.

Choppin is sometimes credited with co-discovering the elements einsteinium and fermium.
