= Thorium(IV) hydroxide =

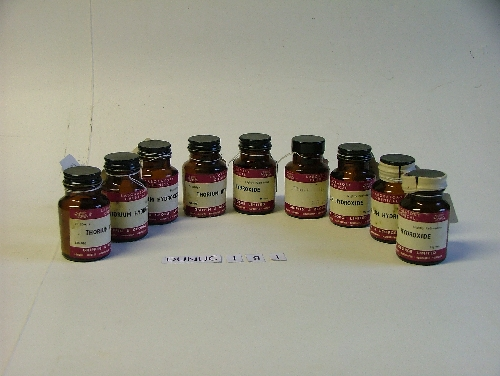

Names
- IUPAC name Thorium(IV) hydroxide

Identifiers
CAS Number	13825-36-0
3D model (JSmol)	Interactive image
ChemSpider	145873
ECHA InfoCard	100.034.097
EC Number	237-522-5
PubChem CID	166732
CompTox Dashboard (EPA)	DTXSID501337265 DTXSID70925731, DTXSID501337265
- InChI: InChI=1S/4H2O.Th/h4*1H2;/q;;;;+4/p-4 Key: SFKTYEXKZXBQRQ-UHFFFAOYSA-J
- SMILES: [OH-].[OH-].[OH-].[OH-].[Th+4]

Properties
Chemical formula	Th(OH)_{4}
Molar mass	300.07
Appearance	white solid

Related compounds
Other anions	thorium dioxide thorium nitrate
Other cations	cerium(IV) hydroxide
- Except where otherwise noted, data are given for materials in their standard state (at 25 °C [77 °F], 100 kPa). Infobox references

Thorium(IV) hydroxide is an inorganic compound with a chemical formula Th(OH)_{4}.

== Production ==
Thorium(IV) hydroxide can be produced by reacting alkali metal hydroxides like sodium hydroxide and potassium hydroxide and soluble thorium salts, such as thorium nitrate.

== Reactions ==
New thorium(IV) hydroxide is soluble in acid but its solubility will decrease when older.

At above 470 °C, thorium(IV) hydroxide will continuously decompose and produce thorium dioxide:

Th(OH)_{4} → ThO_{2} + 2 H_{2}O

Thorium(IV) hydroxide reacts with carbon dioxide gas. Under ambient conditions this produces the hydrated oxide carbonate ThOCO_{3}·xH_{2}O, and under higher pressure this produces thorium carbonate hemihydrate (Th(CO_{3})_{2}·½H_{2}O).

== Bibliography ==
- Wickleder, Mathias S.; Fourest, Blandine; Dorhout, Peter K. (2006). "Thorium". In Morss, Lester R.; Edelstein, Norman M.; Fuger, Jean (eds.). The Chemistry of the Actinide and Transactinide Elements (PDF). Vol. 3 (3rd ed.). Dordrecht, the Netherlands: Springer. pp. 52–160. doi:10.1007/1-4020-3598-5_3. ISBN 978-1-4020-3555-5. Archived from the original (PDF) on 2016-03-07.
