= Thorium(IV) chloride =

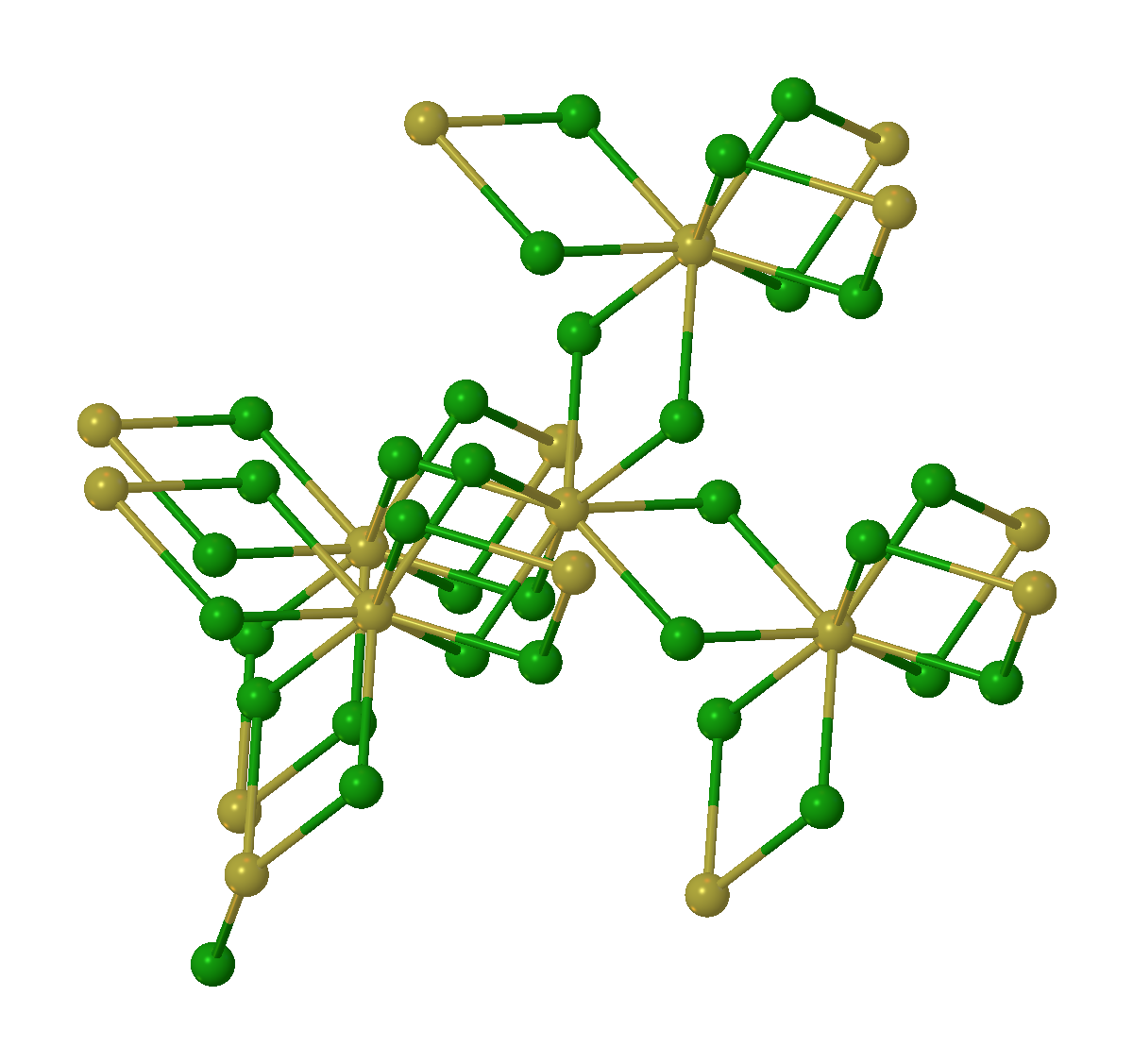
- Thorium(IV) chloride structure

Identifiers
CAS Number	10026-08-1
3D model (JSmol)	Interactive image
ChemSpider	59594
ECHA InfoCard	100.030.039
EC Number	233-056-1
PubChem CID	66209
RTECS number	XO6475000
UNII	24Q3L637MM
CompTox Dashboard (EPA)	DTXSID6064905
- InChI: InChI=1S/4ClH.Th/h4*1H;/q;;;;+4/p-4 Key: WEQHQGJDZLDFID-UHFFFAOYSA-J
- SMILES: Cl[Th](Cl)(Cl)Cl

Properties
Chemical formula	ThCl_{4}
Molar mass	373.849 g/mol
Appearance	white needles hygroscopic
Density	4.59 g/cm^{3}, solid
Melting point	770 °C (1,420 °F; 1,040 K)
Boiling point	921 °C (1,690 °F; 1,194 K)
Solubility	Soluble in ethanol, DMF, NMP, DEF, ethylene glycol, DMSO

Structure
Crystal structure	tetragonal

Hazards
- Lethal dose or concentration (LD, LC)
LD_{50} (median dose)	332 mg/kg intraperitoneal mouse
- Except where otherwise noted, data are given for materials in their standard state (at 25 °C [77 °F], 100 kPa). verify (what is ?) Infobox references

Thorium(IV) chloride describes a family of inorganic compounds with the formula ThCl_{4}(H_{2}O)_{n}. Both the anhydrous and tetrahydrate (n = 4) forms are known. They are hygroscopic, water-soluble white salts.

== Structures ==
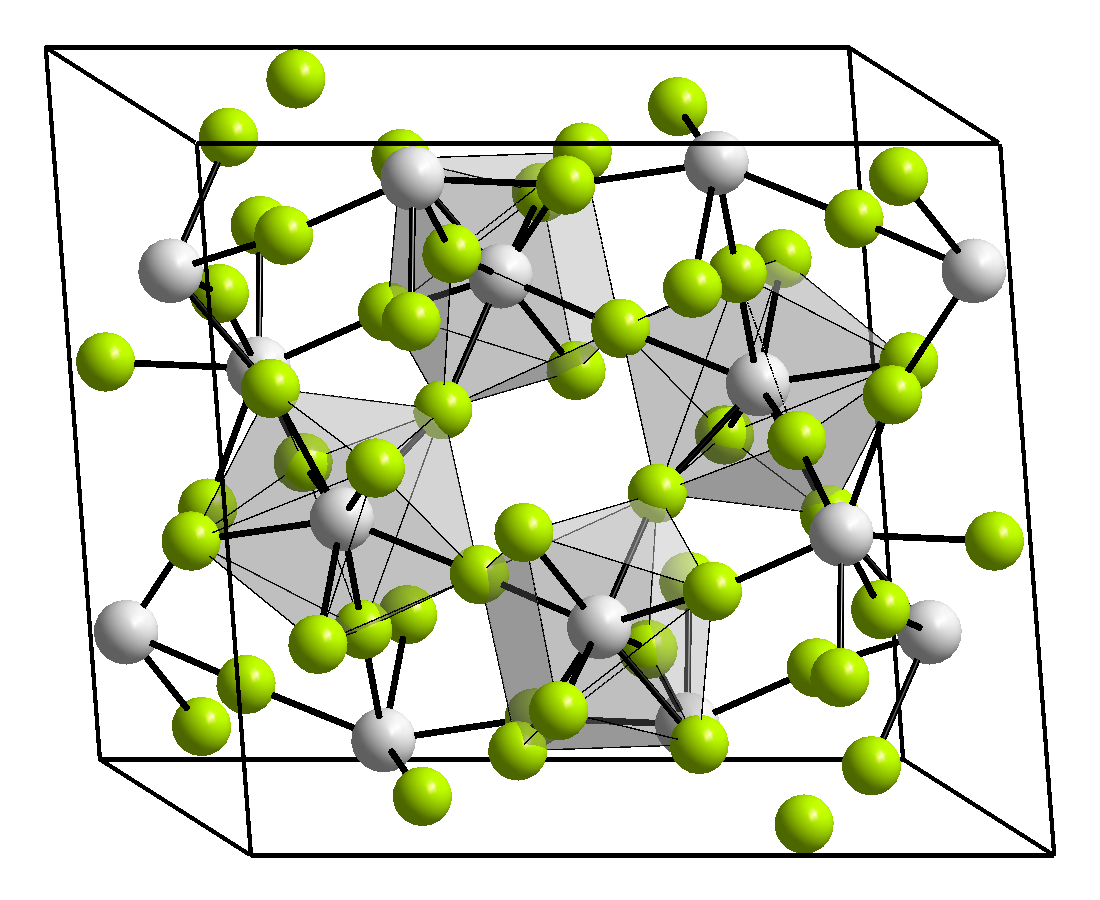
Alternative view of the structure of solid ThCl_{4}.

The structure of thorium(IV) chloride features 8-coordinate Th centers with doubly bridging chloride ligands.

== Synthesis ==
ThCl_{4} was an intermediate in the original isolation of thorium metal by Jons Jacob Berzelius.

Thorium(IV) chloride can be produced in a variety of ways. One method is a carbothermic reaction, 700 °C to 2600 °C, involving thorium oxides and carbon in a stream of chlorine gas:

ThO_{2} + 2 C + 4 Cl_{2} → ThCl_{4} + 2 CO

The chlorination reaction can be effected with carbon tetrachloride:

Th(C_{2}O_{4})_{2} + CCl_{4} → ThCl_{4} + 3 CO + 3 CO_{2}

In another two-step method, thorium metal reacts with ammonium chloride:

Th + 6 NH_{4}Cl → (NH_{4})_{2}ThCl_{6} + 4 NH_{3} + 2 H_{2}

The hexachloride salt is then heated at 350 °C under a high vacuum to produce ThCl_{4}.

== Reactions ==
Lewis base adducts

ThCl_{4} reacts with Lewis bases to give molecular adducts, such as ThCl_{4}(DME)_{2} and ThCl_{4}(TMEDA)_{2}.

Reduction to Th metal

Thorium(IV) chloride is an intermediate in the purification of thorium, which can be affected by:

1. Reduction of ThCl_{4} with alkali metals.
2. Electrolysis of anhydrous thorium(IV) chloride in fused mixture of NaCl and KCl.
3. Ca reduction of a mixture of ThCl_{4} with anhydrous zinc chloride.
