= Isotopes of berkelium =

Isotopes of berkelium (_{97}Bk)
Main isotopes			Decay	
Isotope	abundance	half-life (t_{1/2})	mode	product
^{245}Bk	synth	4.94 d	ε	^{245}Cm
^{245}Bk	synth	4.94 d	α	^{241}Am
^{246}Bk	synth	1.80 d	β^{+}	^{246}Cm
^{246}Bk	synth	1.80 d	α	^{242}Am
^{247}Bk	synth	1380 y	α	^{243}Am
^{248}Bk	synth	>9 y	α	^{244}Am
^{249}Bk	trace	327.2 d	β^{−}	^{249}Cf
^{249}Bk	trace	327.2 d	α	^{245}Am
^{249}Bk	trace	327.2 d	SF	–

Berkelium (_{97}Bk) is an artificial element, and thus a standard atomic weight cannot be given. Like all artificial elements, it has no stable isotopes. The first isotope to be synthesized was ^{243}Bk in 1949. There are twenty known radioisotopes, from ^{233}Bk to ^{253}Bk (except ^{237}Bk), and seven nuclear isomers. The longest-lived isotope known is ^{247}Bk with a half-life of 1,380 years; however ^{248}Bk, which has not been observed to decay, may live longer.

The isotope commonly used in study, though, is ^{249}Bk, as is it the only berkelium isotope that can be usefully extracted from reactor actinides and accumulated in weighable quantities.

== List of isotopes ==
Nuclide (Note: ^{m}Bk – Excited nuclear isomer.)	Z	N	Isotopic mass (Da) (Note: ( ) – Uncertainty (1σ) is given in concise form in parentheses after the corresponding last digits.) (Note: # – Atomic mass marked #: value and uncertainty derived not from purely experimental data, but at least partly from trends from the Mass Surface (TMS).)	Discovery year	Half-life	Decay mode (Note: Modes of decay: EC: / Electron capture; SF: / Spontaneous fission)	Daughter isotope	Spin and parity (Note: ( ) spin value – Indicates spin with weak assignment arguments.) (Note: # – Values marked # are not purely derived from experimental data, but at least partly from trends of neighboring nuclides (TNN).)
Nuclide	Excitation energy			Discovery year	Half-life	Decay mode	Daughter isotope	Spin and parity
^{233}Bk	97	136	233.05665(25)#	2015	40(30) s	α (82%)	^{229}Am	3/2−#
^{233}Bk	97	136	233.05665(25)#	2015	40(30) s	β^{+}? (18%)	^{233}Cm	3/2−#
^{234}Bk	97	137	234.05732(16)#	2016	20(5) s	α (>80%)	^{230}Am	3−#
^{234}Bk	97	137	234.05732(16)#	2016	20(5) s	β^{+} (<20%)	^{234}Cm	3−#
^{235}Bk	97	138	235.05665(43)#	2026	1# min	α	^{231}Am	3/2−#
^{235}Bk	97	138	235.05665(43)#	2026	1# min	β^{+}	^{235}Cm	3/2−#
^{236}Bk	97	139	236.05748(39)#	2017	26(10) s	β^{+} (99.96%)	^{236}Cm	4+#
^{236}Bk	97	139	236.05748(39)#	2017	26(10) s	β^{+}, SF (0.04%)	(various)	4+#
^{238}Bk	97	141	238.05820(28)#	1994	2.40(8) min	β^{+} (99.95%)	^{238}Cm	1#
^{238}Bk	97	141	238.05820(28)#	1994	2.40(8) min	β^{+}, SF (0.048%)	(various)	1#
^{239}Bk	97	142	239.05824(22)#	(2010) (Note: Populated, but no properties measured, not included in discovery database)	100# s	β^{+}	^{239}Cm	(7/2+)
^{240}Bk	97	143	240.05976(16)#	1980	4.8(8) min	β^{+}?	^{240}Cm	7−#
^{240}Bk	97	143	240.05976(16)#	1980	4.8(8) min	α?	^{236}Am	7−#
^{240}Bk	97	143	240.05976(16)#	1980	4.8(8) min	β^{+}, SF (0.0013%)	(various)	7−#
^{241}Bk	97	144	241.06010(18)#	2003	4.6(4) min	β^{+}	^{241}Cm	(7/2+)
^{242}Bk	97	145	242.06200(14)#	1972	7.0(13) min	β^{+}	^{242}Cm	3+#
^{242}Bk	97	145	242.06200(14)#	1972	7.0(13) min	β^{+}, SF (<3×10^{−5}%)	(various)	3+#
^{242m}Bk	2000(200)# keV			1979	600(100) ns	SF	(various)	
^{243}Bk	97	146	243.063006(5)	1950	4.6(2) h	β^{+} (99.85%)	^{243}Cm	3/2−
^{243}Bk	97	146	243.063006(5)	1950	4.6(2) h	α (0.15%)	^{239}Am	3/2−
^{244}Bk	97	147	244.065179(15)	1972	5.02(3) h	β^{+} (99.994%) (Note: NUBASE2020 question-marks this decay, but it has been observed directly, see e.g. the IAEA Chart of Nuclides.)	^{244}Cm	4−
^{244}Bk	97	147	244.065179(15)	1972	5.02(3) h	α (0.006%)	^{240}Am	4−
^{244m}Bk	1500(500)# keV			2014	820(60) ns	SF	(various)	
^{245}Bk	97	148	245.0663598(19)	1951	4.95(3) d	EC (99.88%)	^{245}Cm	3/2−
^{245}Bk	97	148	245.0663598(19)	1951	4.95(3) d	α (0.12%)	^{241}Am	3/2−
^{246}Bk	97	149	246.06867(6)	1954	1.80(2) d	β^{+}	^{246}Cm	2(−)
^{247}Bk	97	150	247.070306(6)	1965	1.38(25)×10^{3} y	α	^{243}Am	3/2−
^{247}Bk	97	150	247.070306(6)	1965	1.38(25)×10^{3} y	SF?	(various)	3/2−
^{248}Bk	97	151	248.07314(5)	1956	>9 y	α?	^{244}Am	6+#
^{248}Bk	97	151	248.07314(5)	1956	>9 y	EC?	^{248}Cm	6+#
^{248}Bk	97	151	248.07314(5)	1956	>9 y	β^{−}?	^{248}Cf	6+#
^{248m}Bk (Note: Order of ground state and isomer is uncertain.)	−20(50) keV			1965	23.7(2) h	β^{−} (70%)	^{248}Cf	1(−)
^{248m}Bk	−20(50) keV			1965	23.7(2) h	EC (30%)	^{248}Cm	1(−)
^{249}Bk	97	152	249.0749831(13)	1954	327.2(3) d	β^{−}	^{249}Cf	7/2+
^{249}Bk	97	152	249.0749831(13)	1954	327.2(3) d	α (0.00145%)	^{245}Am	7/2+
^{249}Bk	97	152	249.0749831(13)	1954	327.2(3) d	SF (4.7×10^{−8}%)	(various)	7/2+
^{249m}Bk	8.777(14) keV			(1960) (Note: Only published in a conference proceeding and not a refereed journal)	300 μs	IT	^{249}Bk	3/2−
^{250}Bk	97	153	250.078317(3)	1954	3.212(5) h	β^{−}	^{250}Cf	2−
^{250m1}Bk	35.59(10) keV			1966	29(1) μs	IT	^{250}Bk	4+
^{250m2}Bk	85.6(16) keV			1966	213(8) μs	IT	^{250}Bk	7+
^{251}Bk	97	154	251.080761(12)	1967	55.6(11) min	β^{−}	^{251}Cf	(3/2−)
^{251m}Bk	35.5(13) keV			(1966) (Note: Half-life not measured, not included in discovery database)	58(4) μs	IT	^{251}Bk	(7/2+)
^{252}Bk	97	155	252.08431(22)#	(1992)	1.8(5) min	β^{−}	^{252}Cf	
^{253}Bk	97	156	253.08688(39)#	(1992)	60# min	β^{−}?	^{253}Cf	3/2-#
This table header & footer:

== Actinides vs fission products ==
Actinides and fission products by half-life
Actinides by decay chain				Half-life range (a)	Fission products of ^{235}U by yield
4n (Thorium)	4n + 1 (Neptunium)	4n + 2 (Radium)	4n + 3 (Actinium)	Half-life range (a)	4.5–7%	0.04–1.25%	<0.001%
^{228}Ra^{№}				4–6 a		^{155}Eu^{þ}
^{248}Bk				> 9 a
^{244}Cm^{ƒ}	^{241}Pu^{ƒ}	^{250}Cf	^{227}Ac^{№}	10–29 a	^{90}Sr	^{85}Kr	^{113m}Cd^{þ}
^{232}U^{ƒ}		^{238}Pu^{ƒ}	^{243}Cm^{ƒ}	29–97 a	^{137}Cs	^{151}Sm^{þ}	^{121m}Sn
	^{249}Cf^{ƒ}	^{242m}Am^{ƒ}		141–351 a	No fission products have a half-life in the range of 100 a–210 ka ...
	^{241}Am^{ƒ}		^{251}Cf^{ƒ}	430–900 a	No fission products have a half-life in the range of 100 a–210 ka ...
		^{226}Ra^{№}	^{247}Bk	1.3–1.6 ka	No fission products have a half-life in the range of 100 a–210 ka ...
^{240}Pu	^{229}Th	^{246}Cm^{ƒ}	^{243}Am^{ƒ}	4.7–7.4 ka	No fission products have a half-life in the range of 100 a–210 ka ...
	^{245}Cm^{ƒ}	^{250}Cm		8.3–8.5 ka	No fission products have a half-life in the range of 100 a–210 ka ...
			^{239}Pu^{ƒ}	24.1 ka	No fission products have a half-life in the range of 100 a–210 ka ...
		^{230}Th^{№}	^{231}Pa^{№}	32–76 ka	No fission products have a half-life in the range of 100 a–210 ka ...
^{236}Np^{ƒ}	^{233}U^{ƒ}	^{234}U^{№}		150–250 ka	^{99}Tc^{₡}	^{126}Sn
^{248}Cm		^{242}Pu		327–375 ka		^{79}Se^{₡}
				1.33 Ma	^{135}Cs^{₡}
	^{237}Np^{ƒ}			1.61–6.5 Ma	^{93}Zr	^{107}Pd
^{236}U			^{247}Cm^{ƒ}	15–24 Ma		^{129}I^{₡}
^{244}Pu				80 Ma	... nor beyond 15.7 Ma
^{232}Th^{№}		^{238}U^{№}	^{235}U^{ƒ№}	0.7–14.1 Ga	... nor beyond 15.7 Ma
₡, has thermal neutron capture cross section in the range of 8–50 barns; ƒ, fissile; №, primarily a naturally occurring radioactive material (NORM); þ, neutron poison (thermal neutron capture cross section greater than 3k barns)
