= Isotopes of protactinium =

Isotopes of protactinium (_{91}Pa)
Main isotopes			Decay	
Isotope	abundance	half-life (t_{1/2})	mode	product
^{229}Pa	synth	1.55 d	ε	^{229}Th
^{229}Pa	synth	1.55 d	α	^{225}Ac
^{230}Pa	synth	17.4 d	β^{+}	^{230}Th
^{230}Pa	synth	17.4 d	β^{−}	^{230}U
^{230}Pa	synth	17.4 d	α	^{226}Ac
^{231}Pa	100%	3.265×10^{4} y	α	^{227}Ac
^{232}Pa	synth	1.32 d	β^{−}	^{232}U
^{233}Pa	trace	26.975 d	β^{−}	^{233}U
^{234}Pa	trace	6.70 h	β^{−}	^{234}U
^{234m}Pa	trace	1.159 min	β^{−}	^{234}U

Standard atomic weight A_{r}°(Pa)
- 231.03588±0.00001; 231.04±0.01 (abridged)

Protactinium (_{91}Pa) has no stable isotopes. As ^{231}Pa occurs in usable quantity, and comprises virtually all of the element, it defines the standard atomic weight.

Thirty radioisotopes of protactinium have been characterized, ranging from ^{210}Pa to ^{239}Pa. The most stable isotopes are ^{231}Pa with a half-life of 32,700 years, ^{233}Pa with a half-life of 26.975 days, and ^{230}Pa with a half-life of 17.4 days. All of the remaining radioactive isotopes have half-lives less than 1.6 days, and the majority of these have half-lives less than 1.8 seconds. This element also has five meta states, ^{217m}Pa (t_{1/2} 1.15 milliseconds), ^{220m1}Pa (t_{1/2} = 308 nanoseconds), ^{220m2}Pa (t_{1/2} = 69 nanoseconds), ^{229m}Pa (t_{1/2} = 420 nanoseconds), and ^{234m}Pa (t_{1/2} = 1.16 minutes).

The only naturally occurring isotopes are ^{231}Pa, ^{233}Pa, ^{234}Pa, and ^{234m}Pa. The first occurs as an intermediate decay product of ^{235}U, the second of (rare) ^{237}Np, and the last two as intermediate decay products of ^{238}U. ^{231}Pa dominates solely because of its longer life.

The primary decay mode for protactinium isotopes lighter than (and including) the most stable isotope ^{231}Pa is alpha decay to isotopes of actinium, except ^{228}Pa to ^{230}Pa, which primarily decay by electron capture to isotopes of thorium. The primary mode for the heavier isotopes is beta minus (β^{−}) decay to isotopes of uranium.

== List of isotopes ==
Nuclide (Note: ^{m}Pa – Excited nuclear isomer.)	Historic name	Z	N	Isotopic mass (Da) (Note: ( ) – Uncertainty (1σ) is given in concise form in parentheses after the corresponding last digits.) (Note: # – Atomic mass marked #: value and uncertainty derived not from purely experimental data, but at least partly from trends from the Mass Surface (TMS).)	Discovery year	Half-life (Note: # – Values marked # are not purely derived from experimental data, but at least partly from trends of neighboring nuclides (TNN).)	Decay mode (Note: Modes of decay: EC: / Electron capture; CD: / Cluster decay; IT: / Isomeric transition; SF: / Spontaneous fission)	Daughter isotope (Note: Bold italics symbol as daughter – Daughter product is nearly stable.)	Spin and parity (Note: ( ) spin value – Indicates spin with weak assignment arguments.)	Isotopic abundance
Nuclide	Historic name	Excitation energy			Discovery year	Half-life	Decay mode	Daughter isotope	Spin and parity	Isotopic abundance
^{210}Pa		91	119		2025	6.0+1.5 −1.1 ms	α	^{206}Ac	3+	
^{211}Pa		91	120	211.023674(75)	2020	6(3) ms	α	^{207}Ac	9/2−	
^{212}Pa		91	121	212.023185(94)	1997	5.8(19) ms	α	^{208}Ac	3+#	
^{213}Pa		91	122	213.021100(61)	1995	7.4(24) ms	α	^{209}Ac	9/2−	
^{214}Pa		91	123	214.020891(87)	1995	17(3) ms	α	^{210}Ac	7+#	
^{215}Pa		91	124	215.019114(89)	1979	14(2) ms	α	^{211}Ac	9/2−	
^{216}Pa		91	125	216.019135(26)	1971	105(12) ms	α	^{212}Ac	5+#	
^{217}Pa		91	126	217.018309(13)	1968	3.8(2) ms	α	^{213}Ac	9/2−	
^{217m}Pa		1860(7) keV			1979	1.08(3) ms	α (73%)	^{213}Ac	(23/2−)	
^{217m}Pa		1860(7) keV			1979	1.08(3) ms	IT (27%)	^{217}Pa	(23/2−)	
^{218}Pa		91	127	218.020021(19)	1979	108(5) μs	α	^{214}Ac	8−#	
^{218m}Pa		81(19) keV			2020	150(50) μs	α	^{214}Ac		
^{219}Pa		91	128	219.019950(75)	2005	56(9) ns	α	^{215}Ac	9/2−	
^{220}Pa		91	129	220.021770(16)	2005	850(60) ns	α	^{216}Ac	1−#	
^{220m1}Pa (Note: Order of ground state and isomer is uncertain.)		26(23) keV			2018	410(180) ns	α	^{216}Ac		
^{220m2}Pa		290(50) keV			2018	260(210) ns	α	^{216}Ac		
^{220m3}Pa		118(40) keV			2021	233+108 −56 ns	α	^{216}Ac	(3−)	
^{221}Pa		91	130	221.021873(64)	1983	5.9(17) μs	α	^{217}Ac	9/2−	
^{222}Pa		91	131	222.023687(93)	1970	3.8(2) ms	α	^{218}Ac	1−#	
^{223}Pa		91	132	223.023980(81)	1970	5.3(3) ms	α	^{219}Ac	9/2−	
^{224}Pa		91	133	224.0256173(81)	1970	844(19) ms	α	^{220}Ac	(5−)	
^{225}Pa		91	134	225.026148(88)	1968	1.71(10) s	α	^{221}Ac	5/2−#	
^{226}Pa		91	135	226.027948(12)	1949	1.8(2) min	α (74%)	^{222}Ac	1−#	
^{226}Pa		91	135	226.027948(12)	1949	1.8(2) min	β^{+} (26%)	^{226}Th	1−#	
^{227}Pa		91	136	227.0288036(78)	1948	38.3(3) min	α (85%)	^{223}Ac	(5/2−)	
^{227}Pa		91	136	227.0288036(78)	1948	38.3(3) min	EC (15%)	^{227}Th	(5/2−)	
^{228}Pa		91	137	228.0310508(47)	1948	22(1) h	β^{+} (98.15%)	^{228}Th	3+	
^{228}Pa		91	137	228.0310508(47)	1948	22(1) h	α (1.85%)	^{224}Ac	3+	
^{229}Pa		91	138	229.0320956(35)	1949	1.55(4) d	EC (99.51%)	^{229}Th	5/2+	
^{229}Pa		91	138	229.0320956(35)	1949	1.55(4) d	α (0.49%)	^{225}Ac	5/2+	
^{229m}Pa		12.20(4) keV			1982	420(30) ns	IT	^{229}Pa	3/2−	
^{230}Pa		91	139	230.0345397(33)	1948	17.4(5) d	β^{+} (92.2%)	^{230}Th	2−	
^{230}Pa		91	139	230.0345397(33)	1948	17.4(5) d	β^{−} (7.8%)	^{230}U	2−	
^{230}Pa		91	139	230.0345397(33)	1948	17.4(5) d	α (0.0032%)	^{226}Ac	2−	
^{231}Pa	Protoactinium; Protactinium (Note: Source of element's name.)	91	140	231.0358825(19)	1918	3.265(20)×10^{4} y	α	^{227}Ac	3/2−	1.0000 (Note: Intermediate decay product of ^{235}U)
^{231}Pa	Protoactinium; Protactinium	91	140	231.0358825(19)	1918	3.265(20)×10^{4} y	CD (1.34×10^{−9}%)	^{207}Tl + ^{24}Ne	3/2−	1.0000
^{231}Pa	Protoactinium; Protactinium	91	140	231.0358825(19)	1918	3.265(20)×10^{4} y	SF (<3×10^{−10}%)	(various)	3/2−	1.0000
^{231}Pa	Protoactinium; Protactinium	91	140	231.0358825(19)	1918	3.265(20)×10^{4} y	CD (~10^{−12}%)	^{208}Pb + ^{23}F	3/2−	1.0000
^{232}Pa		91	141	232.0385902(82)	1949	1.32(2) d	β^{−}	^{232}U	(2−)	
^{233}Pa		91	142	233.0402465(14)	1938	26.975(13) d	β^{−}	^{233}U	3/2−	Trace (Note: Intermediate decay product of ^{237}Np)
^{234}Pa	Uranium Z	91	143	234.0433056(44)	1913	6.70(5) h	β^{−}	^{234}U	4+	Trace (Note: Intermediate decay product of ^{238}U)
^{234m}Pa	Uranium X_{2} Brevium	79(3) keV			1921	1.159(11) min	β^{−} (99.84%)	^{234}U	(0−)	Trace
^{234m}Pa	Uranium X_{2} Brevium	79(3) keV			1921	1.159(11) min	IT (0.16%)	^{234}Pa	(0−)	Trace
^{235}Pa		91	144	235.045399(15)	1950	24.4(2) min	β^{−}	^{235}U	3/2−	
^{236}Pa		91	145	236.048668(15)	1963	9.1(1) min	β^{−}	^{236}U	1(−)	
^{236}Pa		91	145	236.048668(15)	1963	9.1(1) min	β^{−}, SF (6×10^{−8}%)	(various)	1(−)	
^{237}Pa		91	146	237.051023(14)	1954	8.7(2) min	β^{−}	^{237}U	1/2+	
^{238}Pa		91	147	238.054637(17)	1968	2.28(9) min	β^{−}	^{238}U	3−#	
^{238}Pa		91	147	238.054637(17)	1968	2.28(9) min	β^{−}, SF (2.6×10^{−6}%)	(various)	3−#	
^{239}Pa		91	148	239.05726(21)#	1995	1.8(5) h	β^{−}	^{239}U	1/2+#	
This table header & footer:

== Actinides and fission products ==
Actinides and fission products by half-life
Actinides by decay chain				Half-life range (a)	Fission products of ^{235}U by yield
4n (Thorium)	4n + 1 (Neptunium)	4n + 2 (Radium)	4n + 3 (Actinium)	Half-life range (a)	4.5–7%	0.04–1.25%	<0.001%
^{228}Ra^{№}				4–6 a		^{155}Eu^{þ}
^{248}Bk				> 9 a
^{244}Cm^{ƒ}	^{241}Pu^{ƒ}	^{250}Cf	^{227}Ac^{№}	10–29 a	^{90}Sr	^{85}Kr	^{113m}Cd^{þ}
^{232}U^{ƒ}		^{238}Pu^{ƒ}	^{243}Cm^{ƒ}	29–97 a	^{137}Cs	^{151}Sm^{þ}	^{121m}Sn
	^{249}Cf^{ƒ}	^{242m}Am^{ƒ}		141–351 a	No fission products have a half-life in the range of 100 a–210 ka ...
	^{241}Am^{ƒ}		^{251}Cf^{ƒ}	430–900 a	No fission products have a half-life in the range of 100 a–210 ka ...
		^{226}Ra^{№}	^{247}Bk	1.3–1.6 ka	No fission products have a half-life in the range of 100 a–210 ka ...
^{240}Pu	^{229}Th	^{246}Cm^{ƒ}	^{243}Am^{ƒ}	4.7–7.4 ka	No fission products have a half-life in the range of 100 a–210 ka ...
	^{245}Cm^{ƒ}	^{250}Cm		8.3–8.5 ka	No fission products have a half-life in the range of 100 a–210 ka ...
			^{239}Pu^{ƒ}	24.1 ka	No fission products have a half-life in the range of 100 a–210 ka ...
		^{230}Th^{№}	^{231}Pa^{№}	32–76 ka	No fission products have a half-life in the range of 100 a–210 ka ...
^{236}Np^{ƒ}	^{233}U^{ƒ}	^{234}U^{№}		150–250 ka	^{99}Tc^{₡}	^{126}Sn
^{248}Cm		^{242}Pu		327–375 ka		^{79}Se^{₡}
				1.33 Ma	^{135}Cs^{₡}
	^{237}Np^{ƒ}			1.61–6.5 Ma	^{93}Zr	^{107}Pd
^{236}U			^{247}Cm^{ƒ}	15–24 Ma		^{129}I^{₡}
^{244}Pu				80 Ma	... nor beyond 15.7 Ma
^{232}Th^{№}		^{238}U^{№}	^{235}U^{ƒ№}	0.7–14.1 Ga	... nor beyond 15.7 Ma
₡, has thermal neutron capture cross section in the range of 8–50 barns; ƒ, fissile; №, primarily a naturally occurring radioactive material (NORM); þ, neutron poison (thermal neutron capture cross section greater than 3k barns)

== Protactinium-230 ==
Protactinium-230 has 139 neutrons and a half-life of 17.4 days. Most of the time (92%), it undergoes beta plus decay to ^{230}Th, with a smaller (8%) beta-minus decay branch leading to ^{230}U. It also has a very rare (0.0032%) alpha decay mode leading to ^{226}Ac. It is not found in nature because its half-life is short and it is not found in the decay chains of ^{235}U, ^{238}U, or ^{232}Th.

Protactinium-230 is of interest as a progenitor of uranium-230, an isotope that has been considered for use in targeted alpha-particle therapy (TAT). It can be produced through proton or deuteron irradiation of natural thorium.

== Protactinium-231 ==
Protactinium-231 is the longest-lived isotope of protactinium, with a half-life of 32,760 years. In nature, it is found in trace amounts as part of the actinium series, which starts with the primordial isotope uranium-235; the equilibrium concentration in uranium ore is 46.5 atoms of ^{231}Pa per million of ^{235}U. In nuclear reactors, it is one of the few long-lived radioactive actinides produced as a byproduct of the projected thorium fuel cycle, as a result of (n,2n) reactions where a fast neutron removes a neutron from ^{232}Th or ^{232}U, and can also be destroyed by neutron capture, though the cross section for this reaction is also low.

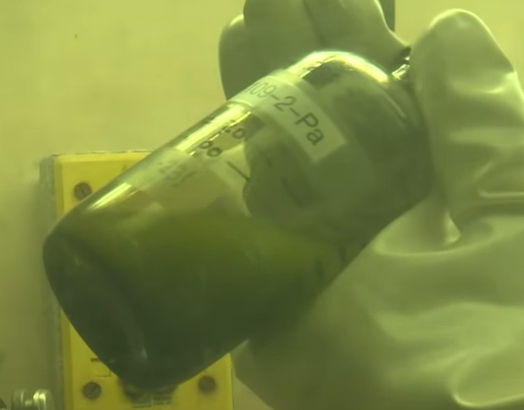
A solution of protactinium-231

binding energy: 1759860 keV
beta decay energy: −382 keV

spin: 3/2−
mode of decay: alpha to ^{227}Ac, also others

possible parent nuclides: beta from ^{231}Th, EC from ^{231}U, alpha from ^{235}Np.

== Protactinium-233 ==
Protactinium-233 is also part of the thorium fuel cycle. It is an intermediate beta decay product between thorium-233 (produced from natural thorium-232 by neutron capture) and uranium-233 (the fissile fuel of the thorium cycle). Some thorium-cycle reactor designs try to protect ^{233}Pa from further neutron capture producing ^{234}Pa and ^{234}U, which are not useful as fuel.

== Protactinium-234 ==
Protactinium-234 is a member of the uranium series with a half-life of 6.70 hours. It was discovered by Otto Hahn in 1921.

=== Protactinium-234m ===
Protactinium-234m is a member of the uranium series with a half-life of 1.17 minutes. It was discovered in 1913 by Kazimierz Fajans and Oswald Helmuth Göhring, who named it brevium for its short half-life. It is now believed that all decays of the parent thorium-234 produce this isomer and the ground state is observed because of (invisible) IT decay. Protactinium-234m has the same mass (same number of protons and neutrons) as protactinium-234, the difference merely visible in their non-identical half-life, with protactinium-234m having a noticeably shorter lifespan. This phenomenon is called nuclear isomerism.
