= Isotopes of actinium =

Isotopes of actinium (_{89}Ac)
Main isotopes			Decay	
Isotope	abundance	half-life (t_{1/2})	mode	product
^{225}Ac	trace	9.919 d	α	^{221}Fr
^{226}Ac	synth	29.37 h	β^{−}	^{226}Th
^{226}Ac	synth	29.37 h	ε	^{226}Ra
^{226}Ac	synth	29.37 h	α	^{222}Fr
^{227}Ac	trace	21.772 y	β^{−}	^{227}Th
^{227}Ac	trace	21.772 y	α	^{223}Fr
^{228}Ac	trace	6.15 h	β^{−}	^{228}Th

Actinium (_{89}Ac) has no stable isotopes and no characteristic terrestrial isotopic composition, thus a standard atomic weight cannot be given. There are 34 known isotopes, from ^{203}Ac to ^{236}Ac, and nine isomers. Three isotopes are found in nature, ^{225}Ac, ^{227}Ac and ^{228}Ac, in the respective decay chains of ^{237}Np, ^{235}U, and ^{232}Th. ^{228}Ac and ^{225}Ac are extremely rare, so almost all natural actinium is ^{227}Ac.

The most stable isotopes are ^{227}Ac with a half-life of 21.772 years, ^{225}Ac with a half-life of 9.919 days, and ^{226}Ac with a half-life of 29.37 hours. All other isotopes have half-lives under seven hours, and most under a minute. The shortest-lived known isotope is ^{217}Ac with a half-life of 69 ns.

Purified ^{227}Ac comes into equilibrium with its decay products (mainly ^{227}Th and ^{223}Ra) after 185 days.

== List of isotopes ==
Nuclide (Note: ^{m}Ac – Excited nuclear isomer.)	Historic name	Z	N	Isotopic mass (Da) (Note: ( ) – Uncertainty (1σ) is given in concise form in parentheses after the corresponding last digits.) (Note: # – Atomic mass marked #: value and uncertainty derived not from purely experimental data, but at least partly from trends from the Mass Surface (TMS).)	Discovery year	Half-life	Decay mode (Note: Modes of decay: EC: / Electron capture; CD: / Cluster decay; IT: / Isomeric transition)	Daughter isotope (Note: Bold italics symbol as daughter – Daughter product is nearly stable.)	Spin and parity (Note: ( ) spin value – Indicates spin with weak assignment arguments.) (Note: # – Values marked # are not purely derived from experimental data, but at least partly from trends of neighboring nuclides (TNN).)	Isotopic abundance
Nuclide	Historic name	Excitation energy			Discovery year	Half-life	Decay mode	Daughter isotope	Spin and parity	Isotopic abundance
^{203}Ac		89	114		2024	56+269 −26 μs	α	^{199}Fr	(1/2+)	
^{204}Ac		89	115		2022	7.4+2.2 −1.4 ms	α	^{200}Fr		
^{205}Ac		89	116	205.01514(6)	2014	7.7+2.7 −1.6 ms	α	^{201}Fr	9/2−	
^{206}Ac		89	117	206.01448(7)	1998	25(7) ms	α	^{202}Fr	(3+)	
^{206m}Ac		200(70) keV			1998	41(16) ms	α	^{202m}Fr	(10−)	
^{207}Ac		89	118	207.01197(6)	1994	31(8) ms	α	^{203}Fr	9/2−#	
^{207m}Ac		374(2) keV			2026	680+300 −160 ns	IT	^{207}Ac	(13/2+)	
^{208}Ac		89	119	208.01155(7)	1994	97(15) ms	α	^{204}Fr	(3+)	
^{208m}Ac		500(60) keV			1994	28(7) ms	α	^{204}Fr	(10−)	
^{208m}Ac		500(60) keV			1994	28(7) ms	IT ?	^{208}Ac	(10−)	
^{209}Ac		89	120	209.00950(6)	1968	94(10) ms	α	^{205}Fr	(9/2−)	
^{210}Ac		89	121	210.00941(7)	1968	350(40) ms	α	^{206}Fr	7+#	
^{211}Ac		89	122	211.00767(6)	1968	213(25) ms	α	^{207}Fr	9/2−	
^{212}Ac		89	123	212.007836(23)	1968	895(28) ms	α	^{208}Fr	7+	
^{213}Ac		89	124	213.006593(13)	1968	738(16) ms	α	^{209}Fr	9/2−	
^{214}Ac		89	125	214.006906(15)	1968	8.2(2) s	α (93%)	^{210}Fr	5+	
^{214}Ac		89	125	214.006906(15)	1968	8.2(2) s	β^{+} (7%)	^{214}Ra	5+	
^{215}Ac		89	126	215.006474(13)	1968	171(10) ms	α (99.91%)	^{211}Fr	9/2−	
^{215}Ac		89	126	215.006474(13)	1968	171(10) ms	β^{+} (0.09%)	^{215}Ra	9/2−	
^{215m1}Ac		1796.0(9) keV			1983	185(30) ns	IT	^{215}Ac	(21/2−)	
^{215m2}Ac		2488(50)# keV			1983	335(10) ns	IT	^{215}Ac	(29/2+)	
^{216}Ac		89	127	216.008749(10)	1966	440(16) μs	α	^{212}Fr	(1−)	
^{216m1}Ac		38(5) keV			1970	441(7) μs	α	^{212}Fr	(9−)	
^{216m2}Ac		422(100)# keV			(2006) (Note: Only published in a conference proceeding and not a refereed journal)	~300 ns	IT	^{216}Ac		
^{217}Ac		89	128	217.009342(12)	1972	69(4) ns	α	^{213}Fr	9/2−	
^{217m}Ac		2012(20) keV			1973	740(40) ns			29/2+	
^{218}Ac		89	129	218.01165(6)	1970	1.00(4) μs	α	^{214}Fr	(1−)	
^{218m}Ac		607(86)# keV			1994	103(11) ns	IT	^{218}Ac	(11+)	
^{219}Ac		89	130	219.01242(6)	1970	9.4(10) μs	α	^{215}Fr	9/2−	
^{220}Ac		89	131	220.014755(7)	1970	26.36(19) ms	α	^{216}Fr	(3−)	
^{221}Ac		89	132	221.01560(6)	1968	52(2) ms	α	^{217}Fr	9/2−#	
^{222}Ac		89	133	222.017844(5)	1949	5.0(5) s	α	^{218}Fr	1−	
^{222}Ac		89	133	222.017844(5)	1949	5.0(5) s	β^{+} (<2%)	^{222}Ra	1−	
^{222m}Ac		78(21) keV			1972	1.05(5) min	α (98.6%)	^{218}Fr	5+#	
^{222m}Ac		78(21) keV			1972	1.05(5) min	β^{+} (1.4%)	^{222}Ra	5+#	
^{222m}Ac		78(21) keV			1972	1.05(5) min	IT?	^{222}Ac	5+#	
^{223}Ac		89	134	223.019136(7)	1948	2.10(5) min	α	^{219}Fr	(5/2−)	
^{223}Ac		89	134	223.019136(7)	1948	2.10(5) min	EC ?	^{223}Ra	(5/2−)	
^{223}Ac		89	134	223.019136(7)	1948	2.10(5) min	CD (3.2×10^{−9}%)	^{209}Bi + ^{14}C	(5/2−)	
^{224}Ac		89	135	224.021722(4)	1948	2.78(16) h	β^{+} (90.5%)	^{224}Ra	(0−)	
^{224}Ac		89	135	224.021722(4)	1948	2.78(16) h	α (9.5%)	^{220}Fr	(0−)	
^{224}Ac		89	135	224.021722(4)	1948	2.78(16) h	β^{−} ?	^{224}Th	(0−)	
^{225}Ac (Note: Has medical uses)		89	136	225.023229(5)	1947	9.9190(21) d	α	^{221}Fr	3/2−	Trace (Note: Intermediate decay product of ^{237}Np)
^{225}Ac		89	136	225.023229(5)	1947	9.9190(21) d	CD (5.3×10^{−10}%)	^{211}Bi + ^{14}C	3/2−	Trace
^{226}Ac		89	137	226.026097(3)	1950	29.37(12) h	β^{−} (83%)	^{226}Th	(1−)	
^{226}Ac		89	137	226.026097(3)	1950	29.37(12) h	EC (17%)	^{226}Ra	(1−)	
^{226}Ac		89	137	226.026097(3)	1950	29.37(12) h	α (0.006%)	^{222}Fr	(1−)	
^{227}Ac	Actinium (Note: Source of element's name)	89	138	227.0277506(21)	1911	21.772(3) y	β^{−} (98.62%)	^{227}Th	3/2−	Trace (Note: Intermediate decay product of ^{235}U)
^{227}Ac	Actinium	89	138	227.0277506(21)	1911	21.772(3) y	α (1.38%)	^{223}Fr	3/2−	Trace
^{228}Ac	Mesothorium 2	89	139	228.0310197(22)	1908	6.15(2) h	β^{−}	^{228}Th	3+	Trace (Note: Intermediate decay product of ^{232}Th)
^{228m1}Ac		6.11(9) keV			2021	299(11) ns	IT	^{228}Ac	(1−)	
^{228m2}Ac		20.6(5) keV			2021	115(25) ns	IT	^{228}Ac	(1−)	
^{229}Ac		89	140	229.032947(13)	1952	62.7(5) min	β^{−}	^{229}Th	3/2+	
^{230}Ac		89	141	230.036327(17)	1973	122(3) s	β^{−}	^{230}Th	(1+)	
^{231}Ac		89	142	231.038393(14)	1973	7.5(1) min	β^{−}	^{231}Th	1/2+	
^{232}Ac		89	143	232.042034(14)	1986	1.98(8) min	β^{−}	^{232}Th	(1+)	
^{233}Ac		89	144	233.044346(14)	1983	143(10) s	β^{−}	^{233}Th	(1/2+)	
^{234}Ac		89	145	234.048139(15)	1986	45(2) s	β^{−}	^{234}Th		
^{235}Ac		89	146	235.050840(15)	2003	62(4) s	β^{−}	^{235}Th	1/2+#	
^{236}Ac		89	147	236.05499(4)	2010	72+345 −33 s	β^{−}	^{236}Th		
This table header & footer:

== Actinides vs fission products ==
Actinides and fission products by half-life
Actinides by decay chain				Half-life range (a)	Fission products of ^{235}U by yield
4n (Thorium)	4n + 1 (Neptunium)	4n + 2 (Radium)	4n + 3 (Actinium)	Half-life range (a)	4.5–7%	0.04–1.25%	<0.001%
^{228}Ra^{№}				4–6 a		^{155}Eu^{þ}
^{248}Bk				> 9 a
^{244}Cm^{ƒ}	^{241}Pu^{ƒ}	^{250}Cf	^{227}Ac^{№}	10–29 a	^{90}Sr	^{85}Kr	^{113m}Cd^{þ}
^{232}U^{ƒ}		^{238}Pu^{ƒ}	^{243}Cm^{ƒ}	29–97 a	^{137}Cs	^{151}Sm^{þ}	^{121m}Sn
	^{249}Cf^{ƒ}	^{242m}Am^{ƒ}		141–351 a	No fission products have a half-life in the range of 100 a–210 ka ...
	^{241}Am^{ƒ}		^{251}Cf^{ƒ}	430–900 a	No fission products have a half-life in the range of 100 a–210 ka ...
		^{226}Ra^{№}	^{247}Bk	1.3–1.6 ka	No fission products have a half-life in the range of 100 a–210 ka ...
^{240}Pu	^{229}Th	^{246}Cm^{ƒ}	^{243}Am^{ƒ}	4.7–7.4 ka	No fission products have a half-life in the range of 100 a–210 ka ...
	^{245}Cm^{ƒ}	^{250}Cm		8.3–8.5 ka	No fission products have a half-life in the range of 100 a–210 ka ...
			^{239}Pu^{ƒ}	24.1 ka	No fission products have a half-life in the range of 100 a–210 ka ...
		^{230}Th^{№}	^{231}Pa^{№}	32–76 ka	No fission products have a half-life in the range of 100 a–210 ka ...
^{236}Np^{ƒ}	^{233}U^{ƒ}	^{234}U^{№}		150–250 ka	^{99}Tc^{₡}	^{126}Sn
^{248}Cm		^{242}Pu		327–375 ka		^{79}Se^{₡}
				1.33 Ma	^{135}Cs^{₡}
	^{237}Np^{ƒ}			1.61–6.5 Ma	^{93}Zr	^{107}Pd
^{236}U			^{247}Cm^{ƒ}	15–24 Ma		^{129}I^{₡}
^{244}Pu				80 Ma	... nor beyond 15.7 Ma
^{232}Th^{№}		^{238}U^{№}	^{235}U^{ƒ№}	0.7–14.1 Ga	... nor beyond 15.7 Ma
₡, has thermal neutron capture cross section in the range of 8–50 barns; ƒ, fissile; №, primarily a naturally occurring radioactive material (NORM); þ, neutron poison (thermal neutron capture cross section greater than 3k barns)

== Notable isotopes ==
=== Actinium-225 ===
Actinium-225 is a highly radioactive isotope with 136 neutrons. It is almost exclusively an alpha emitter and has a half-life of 9.919 days. As of 2024, it is being researched as a possible alpha source in targeted alpha therapy. Actinium-225 undergoes a series of three alpha decays – via the short-lived francium-221 and astatine-217 – to ^{213}Bi, which itself is used as an alpha source. Another benefit is that the decay chain of ^{225}Ac ends in the nuclide ^{209}Bi, (Note: Bismuth-209 decays into thallium-205 with a half-life exceeding 10^{19} years, but this half-life is so long that for practical purposes bismuth-209 can be considered stable.) which has a considerably shorter biological half-life than lead. However, a major factor limiting its usage is the difficulty in producing the short-lived isotope, as it is most commonly isolated from aging parent nuclides (such as ^{233}U); it may also be produced in cyclotrons, linear accelerators, or fast breeder reactors.

=== Actinium-226 ===
Actinium-226 is an isotope of actinium with a half-life of 29.37 hours. It mainly (83%) undergoes beta decay, sometimes (17%) undergo electron capture, and rarely (0.006%) undergo alpha decay. There are researches on ^{226}Ac to use it in SPECT.

=== Actinium-227 ===
Actinium-227 is the most stable isotope of actinium, with a half-life of 21.772 years. It mainly (98.62%) undergoes beta decay, but sometimes (1.38%) it will undergo alpha decay instead. ^{227}Ac is a member of the actinium series. It is found only in traces in uranium ores – one tonne of uranium in ore contains about 0.2 milligrams of ^{227}Ac. ^{227}Ac is prepared, in milligram amounts, by the neutron irradiation of ^{226}Ra in a nuclear reactor.

$$\ce{^{226}_{88}Ra + ^{1}_{0}n -> ^{227}_{88}Ra ->[\beta^-][42.2 \ \ce{min}] ^{227}_{89}Ac}$$

^{227}Ac is highly radioactive and was therefore studied for use as an active element of radioisotope thermoelectric generators, for example in spacecraft. The oxide of ^{227}Ac pressed with beryllium is also an efficient neutron source with the activity exceeding that of the standard americium-beryllium and radium-beryllium pairs. In these applications, ^{227}Ac (a weak beta source emitting few alphas of its own) is essentially a progenitor which generates alpha-emitting isotopes upon its decay. Beryllium captures alpha particles and emits neutrons owing to its large cross-section for the (α,n) nuclear reaction:

$$\ce{^{9}_{4}Be + ^{4}_{2}He -> ^{12}_{6}C + ^{1}_{0}n + \gamma}$$

The ^{227}AcBe neutron sources can be applied in a neutron probe – a standard device for measuring the quantity of water present in soil, as well as moisture/density for quality control in highway construction. Such probes are also used in well logging applications, in neutron radiography, tomography and other radiochemical investigations.

The medium half-life of ^{227}Ac makes it a very convenient radioactive isotope in modeling the slow vertical mixing of oceanic waters. The associated processes cannot be studied with the required accuracy by direct measurements of current velocities (of the order 50 meters per year). However, evaluation of the concentration depth-profiles for different isotopes allows estimating the mixing rates. The physics behind this method is as follows: oceanic waters contain homogeneously dispersed ^{235}U. Its decay product, ^{231}Pa, gradually precipitates to the bottom, so that its concentration first increases with depth and then stays nearly constant. ^{231}Pa decays to ^{227}Ac; however, the concentration of the latter isotope does not follow the ^{231}Pa depth profile, but instead increases toward the sea bottom. This occurs because of the mixing processes which raise some additional ^{227}Ac from the sea bottom. Thus analysis of both ^{231}Pa and ^{227}Ac depth profiles allows researchers to model the mixing behavior.

== See also ==
- Actinium series
- Actinide
