= Uranium-236 =

Isotope of uranium

General
- Symbol: ^{236}U
- Names: uranium-236
- Protons (Z): 92
- Neutrons (N): 144

Nuclide data
- Natural abundance: 10^{−11} to 10^{−10}
- Half-life (t_{1/2}): 2.342×10^{7} years
- Isotope mass: 236.045566 Da
- Spin: 0+
- Nuclear binding energy: 1790415.042±1.974 keV
- Parent isotopes: ^{236}Pa^{236}Np^{240}Pu
- Decay products: ^{232}Th

Decay modes
- Decay mode: Decay energy (MeV)
- Alpha: 4.572

Uranium-236 (^{236}U or U-236) is an isotope of uranium that is neither fissile with thermal neutrons, nor very good fertile material, but is generally considered a nuisance and long-lived radioactive waste. It is found in spent nuclear fuel and in the reprocessed uranium made from spent nuclear fuel.

== Creation and yield ==
The fissile isotope uranium-235 fuels most nuclear reactors. When ^{235}U absorbs a thermal neutron, one of two processes can occur. About 85.5% of the time, it will fission; about 14.5% of the time, it will not fission, instead emitting gamma radiation and yielding ^{236}U. Thus, the yield of ^{236}U per ^{235}U+n reaction is about 14.5%, and the yield of fission products is about 85.5%. In comparison, the yields of the most abundant individual fission products like caesium-137, strontium-90, and technetium-99 are between 6% and 7%, and the combined yield of medium-lived (10 years and up) and long-lived fission products is about 32%, or a few percent less as some are transmuted by neutron capture.

The second-most used fissile isotope plutonium-239 can similarly fission or not on absorbing a thermal neutron, the latter giving plutonium-240, a major component of reactor-grade plutonium (plutonium recycled from spent fuel that was originally made with enriched natural uranium and then used once in an LWR). ^{240}Pu decays with a half-life of 6561 years into ^{236}U. In a closed nuclear fuel cycle, most ^{240}Pu will fission (possibly after more than one neutron capture) before it decays, but ^{240}Pu discarded as nuclear waste will decay over thousands of years. As ^{240}Pu has a shorter half-life than ^{239}Pu, the grade of any sample of plutonium mostly composed of those two isotopes will slowly increase, while the total amount of plutonium in the sample will slowly decrease over centuries and millennia. Alpha decay of ^{240}Pu produces uranium-236, while ^{239}Pu decays to uranium-235.

Actinides and fission products by half-life
| Actinides by decay chain | | | | Half-life range (a) | Fission products of ^{235}U by yield |
| 4n (Thorium) | 4n + 1 (Neptunium) | 4n + 2 (Radium) | 4n + 3 (Actinium) | Half-life range (a) | 4.5–7% | 0.04–1.25% | <0.001% |
|---|---|---|---|---|---|---|---|
| ^{228}Ra^{№} | | | | 4–6 a | | ^{155}Eu^{þ} |
| ^{248}Bk | | | | > 9 a |
| ^{244}Cm^{ƒ} | ^{241}Pu^{ƒ} | ^{250}Cf | ^{227}Ac^{№} | 10–29 a | ^{90}Sr | ^{85}Kr | ^{113m}Cd^{þ} |
| ^{232}U^{ƒ} | | ^{238}Pu^{ƒ} | ^{243}Cm^{ƒ} | 29–97 a | ^{137}Cs | ^{151}Sm^{þ} | ^{121m}Sn |
| | ^{249}Cf^{ƒ} | ^{242m}Am^{ƒ} | | 141–351 a | No fission products have a half-life in the range of 100 a–210 ka ... |
| | ^{241}Am^{ƒ} | | ^{251}Cf^{ƒ} | 430–900 a | No fission products have a half-life in the range of 100 a–210 ka ... |
| | | ^{226}Ra^{№} | ^{247}Bk | 1.3–1.6 ka | No fission products have a half-life in the range of 100 a–210 ka ... |
| ^{240}Pu | ^{229}Th | ^{246}Cm^{ƒ} | ^{243}Am^{ƒ} | 4.7–7.4 ka | No fission products have a half-life in the range of 100 a–210 ka ... |
| | ^{245}Cm^{ƒ} | ^{250}Cm | | 8.3–8.5 ka | No fission products have a half-life in the range of 100 a–210 ka ... |
| | | | ^{239}Pu^{ƒ} | 24.1 ka | No fission products have a half-life in the range of 100 a–210 ka ... |
| | | ^{230}Th^{№} | ^{231}Pa^{№} | 32–76 ka | No fission products have a half-life in the range of 100 a–210 ka ... |
| ^{236}Np^{ƒ} | ^{233}U^{ƒ} | ^{234}U^{№} | | 150–250 ka | ^{99}Tc^{₡} | ^{126}Sn |
| ^{248}Cm | | ^{242}Pu | | 327–375 ka | | ^{79}Se^{₡} |
| | | | | 1.33 Ma | ^{135}Cs^{₡} |
| | ^{237}Np^{ƒ} | | | 1.61–6.5 Ma | ^{93}Zr | ^{107}Pd |
| ^{236}U | | | ^{247}Cm^{ƒ} | 15–24 Ma | | ^{129}I^{₡} |
| ^{244}Pu | | | | 80 Ma | ... nor beyond 15.7 Ma |
| ^{232}Th^{№} | | ^{238}U^{№} | ^{235}U^{ƒ№} | 0.7–14.1 Ga | ... nor beyond 15.7 Ma |
₡, has thermal neutron capture cross section in the range of 8–50 barns; ƒ, fissile; №, primarily a naturally occurring radioactive material (NORM); þ, neutron poison (thermal neutron capture cross section greater than 3k barns)

While the largest part of uranium-236 has been produced by neutron capture in nuclear power reactors, that part is nearly all stored in nuclear reactors and waste repositories and has not been released to the environment. The most significant environmental contribution is the ^{238}U(n,3n)^{236}U reaction by fast neutrons in thermonuclear weapons. The nuclear testing of the 1940s, 1950s, and 1960s (atmospheric testing ended 1963) has raised the environmental abundance levels significantly above the expected natural levels.

== Destruction and decay ==
^{236}U, on absorption of a thermal neutron, does not fission, but becomes ^{237}U, which quickly beta decays to ^{237}Np. However, the neutron capture cross section of ^{236}U is low, and this process does not happen quickly in a thermal reactor. Spent nuclear fuel typically contains about 0.4% ^{236}U. With a much greater cross-section, ^{237}Np may eventually absorb another neutron and become ^{238}Np, which quickly beta decays to plutonium-238 (another fissile isotope).

^{236}U and most other actinide isotopes are fissionable by fast neutrons in a nuclear bomb or a fast neutron reactor. A small number of fast reactors have been in research use for decades, but widespread use for power production is still in the future.

Uranium-236 alpha decays with a half-life of 23.42 million years to thorium-232. It is longer-lived than any other artificial actinides or fission products produced in the nuclear fuel cycle. (Plutonium-244, which has a half-life of 81.3 million years, is not produced in significant quantity by the nuclear fuel cycle, and the longer-lived uranium-235, uranium-238, and thorium-232 occur in nature.)

== Difficulty of separation ==
Unlike plutonium, minor actinides, fission products, or activation products, chemical processes cannot separate ^{236}U from ^{238}U, ^{235}U, ^{232}U or other uranium isotopes. It is even difficult to remove with isotopic separation, as low enrichment will concentrate not only the desirable ^{235}U and ^{233}U but the undesirable ^{236}U, ^{234}U and ^{232}U. On the other hand, ^{236}U in the environment cannot separate from ^{238}U and concentrate separately, which limits its radiation hazard in any one place.

== Contribution to radioactivity of reprocessed uranium ==
The half-life of ^{238}U is about 190 times as long as that of ^{236}U; therefore, ^{236}U has about 190 times as much specific activity. Thus, in reprocessed uranium with 0.5% ^{236}U, the ^{236}U and ^{238}U will produce about the same level of radioactivity. (^{235}U contributes only a few percent.)

The ratio is less than 190 when the decay products of each are included. The decay chain of uranium-238 to uranium-234 and eventually lead-206 involves emission of eight alpha particles in a time (hundreds of thousands of years) short compared to the half-life of ^{238}U; so a sample of ^{238}U in equilibrium with its decay products (as in natural uranium ore) has eight times the alpha activity of ^{238}U alone. Even purified natural uranium where the post-uranium decay products have been removed, contains an equilibrium quantity of ^{234}U and therefore about twice the alpha activity of pure ^{238}U. Enrichment to increase ^{235}U content will increase ^{234}U to an even greater degree, and roughly half of this ^{234}U will survive in the spent fuel. On the other hand, ^{236}U decays to thorium-232 which has a half-life of 14 billion years, much longer than its own; so its decay chain effectively stops after one step even at long timescales; and the fact that it is an alpha decay means the external exposure hazard is negligible compared to the natural isotopes.

== Depleted uranium ==
Depleted uranium used in kinetic energy penetrators is supposed to be made from uranium enrichment tailings that have never been irradiated in a nuclear reactor, not reprocessed uranium. It should then contain no detectable amount of uranium-236. However, there have been claims of it being found in some depleted uranium.

| Lighter: uranium-235 | Uranium-236 is an isotope of uranium | Heavier: uranium-237 |
| Decay product of: protactinium-236 neptunium-236 plutonium-240 | Decay chain of uranium-236 | Decays to: thorium-232 |

== See also ==
- Depleted uranium
- Uranium market
- Nuclear reprocessing
- United States Enrichment Corporation
- Nuclear fuel cycle
- Nuclear power
