= Isotopes of curium =

Artificial nuclides with atomic number of 96 but with different mass numbers

Isotopes of curium (_{96}Cm)
Main isotopes			Decay	
Isotope	abundance	half-life (t_{1/2})	mode	product
^{242}Cm	synth	162.8 d	α	^{238}Pu
^{242}Cm	synth	162.8 d	SF	–
^{242}Cm	synth	162.8 d	CD	^{208}Pb
^{243}Cm	synth	29.1 y	α	^{239}Pu
^{243}Cm	synth	29.1 y	ε	^{243}Am
^{243}Cm	synth	29.1 y	SF	–
^{244}Cm	synth	18.11 y	α	^{240}Pu
^{244}Cm	synth	18.11 y	SF	–
^{245}Cm	synth	8250 y	α	^{241}Pu
^{245}Cm	synth	8250 y	SF	–
^{246}Cm	synth	4706 y	α	^{242}Pu
^{246}Cm	synth	4706 y	SF	–
^{247}Cm	synth	1.56×10^{7} y	α	^{243}Pu
^{248}Cm	synth	3.48×10^{5} y	α	^{244}Pu
^{248}Cm	synth	3.48×10^{5} y	SF	–
^{250}Cm	synth	8300 y	SF	–
^{250}Cm	synth	8300 y	α	^{246}Pu
^{250}Cm	synth	8300 y	β^{−}	^{250}Bk

Curium (_{96}Cm) is an artificial element with an atomic number of 96. Because it is an artificial element, a standard atomic weight cannot be given, and it has no stable isotopes. The first isotope synthesized was ^{242}Cm in 1944, which has 146 neutrons.

There are 19 known radioisotopes ranging from ^{233}Cm to ^{251}Cm. There are also ten known nuclear isomers. The longest-lived isotope is ^{247}Cm, with half-life 15.6 million years – orders of magnitude longer than that of any known isotope beyond curium, and long enough to study as a possible extinct radionuclide that would be produced by the r-process. It is followed by ^{248}Cm, which has a half-life of 348,000 years. The longest-lived known isomer is ^{246m}Cm with a half-life of 1.12 seconds.

== List of isotopes ==
Nuclide (Note: ^{m}Cm – Excited nuclear isomer.)	Z	N	Isotopic mass (Da) (Note: ( ) – Uncertainty (1σ) is given in concise form in parentheses after the corresponding last digits.) (Note: # – Atomic mass marked #: value and uncertainty derived not from purely experimental data, but at least partly from trends from the Mass Surface (TMS).)	Discovery year	Half-life (Note: # – Values marked # are not purely derived from experimental data, but at least partly from trends of neighboring nuclides (TNN).)	Decay mode (Note: Modes of decay: EC: / Electron capture; CD: / Cluster decay; SF: / Spontaneous fission)	Daughter isotope	Spin and parity (Note: ( ) spin value – Indicates spin with weak assignment arguments.)
Nuclide	Excitation energy			Discovery year	Half-life	Decay mode	Daughter isotope	Spin and parity
^{233}Cm	96	137	233.05077(9)	2010	27(10) s	β^{+} (80%)	^{233}Am	3/2+#
^{233}Cm	96	137	233.05077(9)	2010	27(10) s	α (20%)	^{229}Pu	3/2+#
^{234}Cm	96	138	234.050159(18)	2016	52(9) s	β^{+} (71%)	^{234}Am	0+
^{234}Cm	96	138	234.050159(18)	2016	52(9) s	α (27%)	^{230}Pu	0+
^{234}Cm	96	138	234.050159(18)	2016	52(9) s	SF (2%)	(various)	0+
^{235}Cm	96	139	235.05155(11)#	2020	7(3) min	β^{+} (96%)	^{235}Am	5/2+#
^{235}Cm	96	139	235.05155(11)#	2020	7(3) min	α (4%)	^{231}Pu	5/2+#
^{236}Cm	96	140	236.051372(19)	2010	6.8(8) min	β^{+} (82%)	^{236}Am	0+
^{236}Cm	96	140	236.051372(19)	2010	6.8(8) min	α (18%)	^{232}Pu	0+
^{237}Cm	96	141	237.05287(8)	2002	>10# min	α (?%)	^{233}Pu	5/2+#
^{238}Cm	96	142	238.053082(13)	1994	2.2(4) h	EC (96.11%)	^{238}Am	0+
^{238}Cm	96	142	238.053082(13)	1994	2.2(4) h	α (3.84%)	^{234}Pu	0+
^{238}Cm	96	142	238.053082(13)	1994	2.2(4) h	SF (0.048%)	(various)	0+
^{239}Cm	96	143	239.05491(16)	2008	2.5(4) h	β^{+}	^{239}Am	7/2−#
^{239}Cm	96	143	239.05491(16)	2008	2.5(4) h	α (6.2x10^{−3}%)	^{235}Pu	7/2−#
^{240}Cm	96	144	240.0555282(20)	1949	30.4(37) d	α	^{236}Pu	0+
^{240}Cm	96	144	240.0555282(20)	1949	30.4(37) d	SF (3.9×10^{−6}%)	(various)	0+
^{241}Cm	96	145	241.0576512(17)	1952	32.8(2) d	EC (99.0%)	^{241}Am	1/2+
^{241}Cm	96	145	241.0576512(17)	1952	32.8(2) d	α (1.0%)	^{237}Pu	1/2+
^{242}Cm	96	146	242.0588342(12)	1949	162.8(2) d	α (Note: Theoretically capable of β^{+}β^{+} decay to ^{242}Pu)	^{238}Pu	0+
^{242}Cm	96	146	242.0588342(12)	1949	162.8(2) d	SF (6.2×10^{−6}%)	(various)	0+
^{242}Cm	96	146	242.0588342(12)	1949	162.8(2) d	CD (1.1×10^{−14}%) (Note: Heaviest known nuclide to undergo cluster decay)	^{208}Pb + ^{34}Si	0+
^{242m}Cm	2800(100) keV			1971	180(70) ns	SF?	(various)	
^{242m}Cm	2800(100) keV			1971	180(70) ns	IT?	^{242}Cm	
^{243}Cm	96	147	243.0613873(16)	1950	29.1(1) y	α (99.71%)	^{239}Pu	5/2+
^{243}Cm	96	147	243.0613873(16)	1950	29.1(1) y	EC (0.29%)	^{243}Am	5/2+
^{243}Cm	96	147	243.0613873(16)	1950	29.1(1) y	SF (5.3×10^{−9}%)	(various)	5/2+
^{243m}Cm	87.4(1) keV			1975	1.08(3) μs	IT	^{243}Cm	1/2+
^{244}Cm	96	148	244.0627506(12)	1950	18.11(3) y	α	^{240}Pu	0+
^{244}Cm	96	148	244.0627506(12)	1950	18.11(3) y	SF (1.37×10^{−4}%)	(various)	0+
^{244m1}Cm	1040.181(11) keV			1963	34(2) ms	IT	^{244}Cm	6+
^{244m2}Cm	1100(900)# keV			(1969) (Note: Only published in a conference proceeding and not a refereed journal)	>500 ns	SF	(various)	
^{245}Cm	96	149	245.0654910(12)	1954	8250(70) y	α	^{241}Pu	7/2+
^{245}Cm	96	149	245.0654910(12)	1954	8250(70) y	SF (6.1×10^{−7}%)	(various)	7/2+
^{245m}Cm	355.92(10) keV			1975	290(20) ns	IT	^{245}Cm	1/2+
^{246}Cm	96	150	246.0672220(16)	1954	4706(40) y	α (99.97%)	^{242}Pu	0+
^{246}Cm	96	150	246.0672220(16)	1954	4706(40) y	SF (0.02615%)	(various)	0+
^{246m}Cm	1179.66(13) keV			2008	1.12(24) s	IT	^{246}Cm	8−
^{247}Cm	96	151	247.070353(4)	1954	1.56(5)×10^{7} y	α (Note: Theoretically capable of β^{−} decay to ^{247}Bk or SF)	^{243}Pu	9/2−
^{247m1}Cm	227.38(19) keV			1968	26.3(3) μs	IT	^{247}Cm	5/2+
^{247m2}Cm	404.90(3) keV			2003	100.6(6) ns	IT	^{247}Cm	1/2+
^{248}Cm	96	152	248.0723491(25)	1956	3.48(6)×10^{5} y	α (91.61%) (Note: Theoretically capable of β^{−}β^{−} decay to ^{248}Cf)	^{244}Pu	0+
^{248}Cm	96	152	248.0723491(25)	1956	3.48(6)×10^{5} y	SF (8.39%)	(various)	0+
^{248m}Cm	1458.1(10) keV			2019	146(18) μs	IT	^{248}Cm	8−#
^{249}Cm	96	153	249.0759540(25)	1956	64.15(3) min	β^{−}	^{249}Bk	1/2+
^{249m}Cm	48.76(4) keV			(1966) (Note: Only quoted from a private communication and not a refereed journal)	23 μs			7/2+
^{250}Cm	96	154	250.078358(11)	1966	8300# y (Note: Only SF has been observed with a half-life 11,300 years; the value given theoretically estimates alpha- and beta-decay branches, which is quite uncertain.)	SF (Note: The nuclide with the lowest atomic number known (almost surely) to undergo spontaneous fission as the main decay mode)	(various)	0+
^{250}Cm	96	154	250.078358(11)	1966	8300# y	α (?%)	^{246}Pu	0+
^{250}Cm	96	154	250.078358(11)	1966	8300# y	β^{−} (?%)	^{250}Bk	0+
^{251}Cm	96	155	251.082285(24)	1978	16.8(2) min	β^{−}	^{251}Bk	(3/2+)
This table header & footer:

== Actinides vs fission products ==
Actinides and fission products by half-life
Actinides by decay chain				Half-life range (a)	Fission products of ^{235}U by yield
4n (Thorium)	4n + 1 (Neptunium)	4n + 2 (Radium)	4n + 3 (Actinium)	Half-life range (a)	4.5–7%	0.04–1.25%	<0.001%
^{228}Ra^{№}				4–6 a		^{155}Eu^{þ}
^{248}Bk				> 9 a
^{244}Cm^{ƒ}	^{241}Pu^{ƒ}	^{250}Cf	^{227}Ac^{№}	10–29 a	^{90}Sr	^{85}Kr	^{113m}Cd^{þ}
^{232}U^{ƒ}		^{238}Pu^{ƒ}	^{243}Cm^{ƒ}	29–97 a	^{137}Cs	^{151}Sm^{þ}	^{121m}Sn
	^{249}Cf^{ƒ}	^{242m}Am^{ƒ}		141–351 a	No fission products have a half-life in the range of 100 a–210 ka ...
	^{241}Am^{ƒ}		^{251}Cf^{ƒ}	430–900 a	No fission products have a half-life in the range of 100 a–210 ka ...
		^{226}Ra^{№}	^{247}Bk	1.3–1.6 ka	No fission products have a half-life in the range of 100 a–210 ka ...
^{240}Pu	^{229}Th	^{246}Cm^{ƒ}	^{243}Am^{ƒ}	4.7–7.4 ka	No fission products have a half-life in the range of 100 a–210 ka ...
	^{245}Cm^{ƒ}	^{250}Cm		8.3–8.5 ka	No fission products have a half-life in the range of 100 a–210 ka ...
			^{239}Pu^{ƒ}	24.1 ka	No fission products have a half-life in the range of 100 a–210 ka ...
		^{230}Th^{№}	^{231}Pa^{№}	32–76 ka	No fission products have a half-life in the range of 100 a–210 ka ...
^{236}Np^{ƒ}	^{233}U^{ƒ}	^{234}U^{№}		150–250 ka	^{99}Tc^{₡}	^{126}Sn
^{248}Cm		^{242}Pu		327–375 ka		^{79}Se^{₡}
				1.33 Ma	^{135}Cs^{₡}
	^{237}Np^{ƒ}			1.61–6.5 Ma	^{93}Zr	^{107}Pd
^{236}U			^{247}Cm^{ƒ}	15–24 Ma		^{129}I^{₡}
^{244}Pu				80 Ma	... nor beyond 15.7 Ma
^{232}Th^{№}		^{238}U^{№}	^{235}U^{ƒ№}	0.7–14.1 Ga	... nor beyond 15.7 Ma
₡, has thermal neutron capture cross section in the range of 8–50 barns; ƒ, fissile; №, primarily a naturally occurring radioactive material (NORM); þ, neutron poison (thermal neutron capture cross section greater than 3k barns)
