= Long-lived fission product =

Critical radionuclides for the long-term safety of nuclear waste repositories

Long-lived fission products (LLFPs) are radioactive materials with a long half-life (more than 200,000 years) produced by nuclear fission of uranium and plutonium. Because of their persistent radiotoxicity, it is necessary to isolate them from humans and the biosphere and to confine them in nuclear waste repositories for geological periods of time. The focus of this article is radioisotopes (radionuclides) generated by fission reactors.

== Evolution of radioactivity in nuclear waste ==
Nuclear fission produces fission products, as well as actinides from nuclear fuel nuclei that capture neutrons but fail to fission, and activation products from neutron activation of reactor or environmental materials.

=== Short-term ===
The high short-term radioactivity of spent nuclear fuel is primarily from fission products with short half-life. The radioactivity in the fission product mixture is mostly due to short-lived isotopes such as ^{131}I and ^{140}Ba, after about four months ^{141}Ce, ^{95}Zr/^{95}Nb and ^{89}Sr constitute the largest contributors, while after about two or three years the largest share is taken by ^{144}Ce/^{144}Pr, ^{106}Ru/^{106}Rh and ^{147}Pm. Note that in the case of a release of radioactivity from a power reactor or used fuel, only some elements are released. As a result, the isotopic signature of the radioactivity is very different from an open air nuclear detonation where all the fission products are dispersed.

=== Medium-lived fission products ===
Medium-lived fission products
Nuclide	t_{1/2}	Yield	Q (Note: Decay energy is split among β, neutrino, and γ if any.)	βγ
	(a)	(%) (Note: Per 65 thermal neutron fissions of ^{235}U and 35 of ^{239}Pu.)	(keV)	
^{155}Eu	4.74	0.0803 (Note: Neutron poison; in thermal reactors most is destroyed by further neutron capture.)	252	βγ
^{85}Kr	10.73	0.2180 (Note: Less than 1/4 of mass-85 fission products as most bypass ground state: Br-85 -> Kr-85m -> Rb-85.)	687	βγ
^{113m}Cd	13.9	0.0008	316	β
^{90}Sr	28.91	4.505	2826 (Note: Has decay energy 546 keV; its decay product Y-90 has decay energy 2.28 MeV with weak gamma branching.)	β
^{137}Cs	30.04	6.337	1176	βγ
^{121m}Sn	43.9	0.00005	390	βγ
^{151}Sm	94.6	0.5314	77	β

After several years of cooling, most radioactivity is from the fission products caesium-137 and strontium-90, which are each produced in about 6% of fissions, and have half-lives of about 30 years. Other fission products with similar half-lives have much lower fission product yields, lower decay energy, and several (^{151}Sm, ^{155}Eu, ^{113m}Cd) are also quickly destroyed by neutron capture while still in the reactor, so are not responsible for more than a tiny fraction of the radiation production at any time. Therefore, in the period from several years to several hundred years after use, radioactivity of spent fuel can be modeled simply as exponential decay of the ^{137}Cs and ^{90}Sr. These are sometimes known as medium-lived fission products.

Krypton-85, the 3rd most active MLFP, is a noble gas which is allowed to escape during current nuclear reprocessing; however, its inertness means that it does not concentrate in the environment, but diffuses to a uniform low concentration in the atmosphere. Spent fuel in the U.S. and some other countries is not likely to be reprocessed until decades after use, and by that time most of the ^{85}Kr will have decayed.

=== Actinides ===
Actinides and fission products by half-life
Actinides by decay chain				Half-life range (a)	Fission products of ^{235}U by yield
4n	4n + 1	4n + 2	4n + 3	Half-life range (a)	4.5–7%	0.04–1.25%	<0.001%
^{228}Ra^{№}				4–6 a		^{155}Eu^{þ}
^{248}Bk				> 9 a
^{244}Cm^{ƒ}	^{241}Pu^{ƒ}	^{250}Cf	^{227}Ac^{№}	10–29 a	^{90}Sr	^{85}Kr	^{113m}Cd^{þ}
^{232}U^{ƒ}		^{238}Pu^{ƒ}	^{243}Cm^{ƒ}	29–97 a	^{137}Cs	^{151}Sm^{þ}	^{121m}Sn
	^{249}Cf^{ƒ}	^{242m}Am^{ƒ}		141–351 a	No fission products have a half-life in the range of 100 a–210 ka ...
	^{241}Am^{ƒ}		^{251}Cf^{ƒ}	430–900 a	No fission products have a half-life in the range of 100 a–210 ka ...
		^{226}Ra^{№}	^{247}Bk	1.3–1.6 ka	No fission products have a half-life in the range of 100 a–210 ka ...
^{240}Pu	^{229}Th	^{246}Cm^{ƒ}	^{243}Am^{ƒ}	4.7–7.4 ka	No fission products have a half-life in the range of 100 a–210 ka ...
	^{245}Cm^{ƒ}	^{250}Cm		8.3–8.5 ka	No fission products have a half-life in the range of 100 a–210 ka ...
			^{239}Pu^{ƒ}	24.1 ka	No fission products have a half-life in the range of 100 a–210 ka ...
		^{230}Th^{№}	^{231}Pa^{№}	32–76 ka	No fission products have a half-life in the range of 100 a–210 ka ...
^{236}Np^{ƒ}	^{233}U^{ƒ}	^{234}U^{№}		150–250 ka	^{99}Tc^{₡}	^{126}Sn
^{248}Cm		^{242}Pu		327–375 ka		^{79}Se^{₡}
				1.33 Ma	^{135}Cs^{₡}
	^{237}Np^{ƒ}			1.61–6.5 Ma	^{93}Zr	^{107}Pd
^{236}U			^{247}Cm^{ƒ}	15–24 Ma		^{129}I^{₡}
^{244}Pu				80 Ma	... nor beyond 15.7 Ma
^{232}Th^{№}		^{238}U^{№}	^{235}U^{ƒ№}	0.7–14.1 Ga	... nor beyond 15.7 Ma
₡, has thermal neutron capture cross section in the range of 8–50 barns; ƒ, fissile; №, primarily a naturally occurring radioactive material (NORM); þ, neutron poison (thermal neutron capture cross section greater than 3k barns)

After ^{137}Cs and ^{90}Sr have decayed to low levels, the bulk of radioactivity from spent fuel come not from fission products but actinides, notably plutonium-239 (half-life 24 ka), plutonium-240 (6.56 ka), americium-241 (432 years), americium-243 (7.37 ka), curium-245 (8.50 ka), and curium-246 (4.73 ka). These can be recovered by nuclear reprocessing (either before or after most ^{137}Cs and ^{90}Sr decay) and fissioned, offering the possibility of greatly reducing waste radioactivity in the time scale of about 10^{3} to 10^{5} years. ^{239}Pu is usable as fuel in existing thermal reactors, but some minor actinides like ^{241}Am, as well as the non-fissile and less-fertile isotope plutonium-242, are better destroyed in fast reactors, accelerator-driven subcritical reactors, or fusion reactors. Americium-241 has some industrial applications and is used in smoke detectors and is thus often separated from waste as it fetches a price that makes such separation economic.

=== Long-lived fission products ===
On scales greater than 10^{5} years, fission products, chiefly ^{99}Tc, again represent a significant proportion of the remaining, though lower radioactivity, along with longer-lived actinides like neptunium-237 and plutonium-242, if those have not been destroyed.

The most abundant long-lived fission products have total decay energy around 100–300 keV, only part of which appears in the beta particle; the rest is lost to a neutrino that has no effect. In contrast, actinides undergo multiple alpha decays, each with decay energy around 4–5 MeV.

Only seven fission products have long half-lives, and these are much longer than 30 years, in the range of 200,000 to 16 million years. These are known as long-lived fission products (LLFP). Three have relatively high yields of about 6%, while the rest appear at much lower yields. (This list of seven excludes isotopes with very slow decay and half-lives longer than the age of the universe, which are effectively stable and already found in nature, as well as a few nuclides like technetium-98 and samarium-146 that are "shadowed" from beta decay and can only occur as direct fission products, not as beta decay products of more neutron-rich initial fission products. The shadowed fission products have yields on the order of one millionth as much as iodine-129.)

== The 7 long-lived fission products ==
Long-lived fission products
Nuclide	t_{1/2}	Yield	Q (Note: Decay energy is split among β, neutrino, and γ if any.)	βγ
	(Ma)	(%) (Note: Per 65 thermal neutron fissions of ^{235}U and 35 of ^{239}Pu.)	(keV)	
^{99}Tc	0.211	6.1385	294	β
^{126}Sn	0.23	0.1084	4050 (Note: Has decay energy 380 keV, but its decay product ^{126}Sb has decay energy 3.67 MeV.)	βγ
^{79}Se	0.33	0.0447	151	β
^{135}Cs	1.33	6.9110 (Note: Lower in thermal reactors because ^{135}Xe, its predecessor, readily absorbs neutrons.)	269	β
^{93}Zr	1.61	5.4575	91	βγ
^{107}Pd	6.5	1.2499	33	β
^{129}I	16.1	0.8410	194	βγ

The first three have similar half-lives, between 200 thousand and 300 thousand years; the last four have longer half-lives, in the low millions of years.

1. Technetium-99 produces the largest amount of LLFP radioactivity. It emits beta particles of low to medium energy but no gamma rays, so has little hazard on external exposure, but only if ingested. However, technetium's chemistry allows it to form anions (pertechnetate, TcO_{4}^{−}) that are relatively mobile in the environment.
2. Tin-126 has a large decay energy (due to its following short half-life decay product) and is the only LLFP that emits energetic gamma radiation, which is an external exposure hazard. However, this isotope is produced in very small quantities in fission by thermal neutrons, so the energy per unit time from ^{126}Sn is only about 5% as much as from ^{99}Tc for U-235 fission, or 20% as much for 65% U-235+35% Pu-239. Fast fission may produce higher yields. Tin is an inert metal with little mobility in the environment, helping to limit health risks from its radiation.
3. Selenium-79 is produced at low yields and emits only weak radiation. Its decay energy per unit time should be only about 0.2% that of Tc-99.
4. Zirconium-93 is produced at a relatively high yield of about 6%, but its decay is 7.5 times slower than Tc-99, and its decay energy is only 30% as great; therefore its energy production is initially only 4% as great as Tc-99, though this fraction will increase as the Tc-99 decays. ^{93}Zr does produce gamma radiation, but of a very low energy, and zirconium is relatively inert in the environment.
5. Caesium-135's predecessor xenon-135 is produced at a high rate of over 6% of fissions, but is an extremely potent absorber of thermal neutrons (neutron poison), so that most of it is transmuted to almost-stable xenon-136 before it can decay to caesium-135. If 90% of ^{135}Xe is destroyed, then the remaining ^{135}Cs's decay energy per unit time is initially only about 1% as great as that of the ^{99}Tc. In a fast reactor, less of the Xe-135 may be destroyed.
  ^{135}Cs is the only alkaline or electropositive LLFP; in contrast, the main medium-lived fission products and the minor actinides other than neptunium are all alkaline and tend to stay together during reprocessing; with many reprocessing techniques such as salt solution or salt volatilization, ^{135}Cs will also stay with this group, although some techniques such as high-temperature volatilization can separate it. Often the alkaline wastes are vitrified to form high level waste, which will include the ^{135}Cs.
  Fission caesium contains not only ^{135}Cs but also stable but neutron-absorbing ^{133}Cs (which wastes neutrons and forms ^{134}Cs which is radioactive with a half-life of 2 years) as well as the common fission product ^{137}Cs which does not absorb neutrons but is highly radioactive, making handling more hazardous and complicated; for all these reasons, transmutation disposal of ^{135}Cs would be more difficult.
6. Palladium-107 has a very long half-life, a low yield (though the yield for plutonium fission is higher than the yield from uranium-235 fission), and very weak radiation. Its initial contribution to LLFP radiation should be only about one part in 10000 for ^{235}U fission, or 2000 for 65% ^{235}U+35% ^{239}Pu. Palladium is a noble metal and extremely inert.
7. Iodine-129 has the longest half-life, 15.7 million years, and due to its higher half-life, lower fission fraction and decay energy it produces only about 1% the intensity of radioactivity as ^{99}Tc. However, radioactive iodine is a disproportionate biohazard because the thyroid gland concentrates iodine. ^{129}I has a half-life nearly a billion times as long as its more hazardous sister isotope ^{131}I; therefore, with a shorter half-life and a higher decay energy, ^{131}I is approximately a billion times more radioactive than the longer-lived ^{129}I.

== LLFP radioactivity compared ==
In total, the other six LLFPs, in thermal reactor spent fuel, initially release only a bit more than 10% as much energy per unit time as Tc-99 for U-235 fission, or 25% as much for 65% U-235+35% Pu-239. About 1000 years after fuel use, radioactivity from the medium-lived fission products Cs-137 and Sr-90 drops below the level of radioactivity from Tc-99 or LLFPs in general. (Actinides, if not removed, will be emitting more radioactivity than either at this point.) By about 1 million years, Tc-99 radioactivity will have declined below that of Zr-93, though immobility of the latter means it is probably still a lesser hazard. By about 3 million years, Zr-93 decay energy will have declined below that of I-129.

Nuclear transmutation is under consideration as a disposal method, primarily for Tc-99 and I-129 as these both represent the greatest biohazards and have the greatest neutron capture cross sections, although transmutation is still slow compared to fission of actinides in a reactor. Transmutation has also been considered for Cs-135, but is almost certainly not worthwhile for the other LLFPs. Given that stable caesium-133 is also produced in nuclear fission and both it and its neutron activation product ^{134}Cs are neutron poisons, transmutation of ^{135}Cs might necessitate isotope separation. ^{99}Tc is particularly attractive for transmutation not only due to the undesirable properties of the product to be destroyed and the relatively high neutron absorption cross section but also because ^{100}Tc rapidly beta decays to stable ^{100}Ru. Ruthenium has no radioactive isotopes with half-lives much longer than a year and the price of ruthenium is relatively high, making the destruction of ^{99}Tc into a potentially lucrative source of producing a precious metal from an undesirable feedstock.
