= Plutonium-241 =

Isotope of plutonium

General
- Symbol: ^{241}Pu
- Names: plutonium-241
- Protons (Z): 94
- Neutrons (N): 147

Nuclide data
- Natural abundance: 0 (synthetic)
- Half-life (t_{1/2}): 14.33 years
- Isotope mass: 241.056850 Da
- Decay products: ^{241}Am^{237}U

Decay modes
- Decay mode: Decay energy (MeV)
- β−: 0.0208
- α: 5.140

Plutonium-241 (^{241}Pu, Pu-241) is an isotope of plutonium formed when plutonium-240 captures a neutron. Like some other plutonium isotopes (especially ^{239}Pu), ^{241}Pu is fissile, with a neutron absorption cross section about one-third greater than that of ^{239}Pu, and a similar probability of fissioning on neutron absorption, around 73%. In the non-fission case, neutron capture produces plutonium-242. In general, isotopes with an odd number of neutrons are both more likely to absorb a neutron and more likely to undergo fission on neutron absorption than isotopes with an even number of neutrons.

== Decay properties ==
Process of successive neutron capture from ^{239}Pu through ^{245}Cm, including ^{241}Pu.

Plutonium-241 is a beta emitter with a half-life of 14.33 years, corresponding to a decay of about 5% of ^{241}Pu nuclei over a one-year period. This decay has a Q-value of only 20.8 keV, and does not emit gamma rays. The longer spent nuclear fuel waits before reprocessing, the more ^{241}Pu decays to americium-241, which is nonfissile (although fissionable by fast neutrons) and an alpha emitter with a half-life of 432.6 years; ^{241}Am, which does emit gamma rays, is a major contributor to the radioactivity of nuclear waste on a scale of hundreds to thousands of years. In its fully ionized state, the beta-decay half-life of ^{241}Pu^{94+} decreases to 4.2 days, and only bound-state beta decay is possible.

Plutonium-241 also has a rare alpha decay branch to uranium-237, occurring in about 0.0025% of decays. Unlike its usual beta decay, this can emit gamma rays, X-rays, and associated electrons.

Actinides and fission products by half-life
Actinides by decay chain				Half-life range (a)	Fission products of ^{235}U by yield
4n (Thorium)	4n + 1 (Neptunium)	4n + 2 (Radium)	4n + 3 (Actinium)	Half-life range (a)	4.5–7%	0.04–1.25%	<0.001%
^{228}Ra^{№}				4–6 a		^{155}Eu^{þ}
^{248}Bk				> 9 a
^{244}Cm^{ƒ}	^{241}Pu^{ƒ}	^{250}Cf	^{227}Ac^{№}	10–29 a	^{90}Sr	^{85}Kr	^{113m}Cd^{þ}
^{232}U^{ƒ}		^{238}Pu^{ƒ}	^{243}Cm^{ƒ}	29–97 a	^{137}Cs	^{151}Sm^{þ}	^{121m}Sn
	^{249}Cf^{ƒ}	^{242m}Am^{ƒ}		141–351 a	No fission products have a half-life in the range of 100 a–210 ka ...
	^{241}Am^{ƒ}		^{251}Cf^{ƒ}	430–900 a	No fission products have a half-life in the range of 100 a–210 ka ...
		^{226}Ra^{№}	^{247}Bk	1.3–1.6 ka	No fission products have a half-life in the range of 100 a–210 ka ...
^{240}Pu	^{229}Th	^{246}Cm^{ƒ}	^{243}Am^{ƒ}	4.7–7.4 ka	No fission products have a half-life in the range of 100 a–210 ka ...
	^{245}Cm^{ƒ}	^{250}Cm		8.3–8.5 ka	No fission products have a half-life in the range of 100 a–210 ka ...
			^{239}Pu^{ƒ}	24.1 ka	No fission products have a half-life in the range of 100 a–210 ka ...
		^{230}Th^{№}	^{231}Pa^{№}	32–76 ka	No fission products have a half-life in the range of 100 a–210 ka ...
^{236}Np^{ƒ}	^{233}U^{ƒ}	^{234}U^{№}		150–250 ka	^{99}Tc^{₡}	^{126}Sn
^{248}Cm		^{242}Pu		327–375 ka		^{79}Se^{₡}
				1.33 Ma	^{135}Cs^{₡}
	^{237}Np^{ƒ}			1.61–6.5 Ma	^{93}Zr	^{107}Pd
^{236}U			^{247}Cm^{ƒ}	15–24 Ma		^{129}I^{₡}
^{244}Pu				80 Ma	... nor beyond 15.7 Ma
^{232}Th^{№}		^{238}U^{№}	^{235}U^{ƒ№}	0.7–14.1 Ga	... nor beyond 15.7 Ma
₡, has thermal neutron capture cross section in the range of 8–50 barns; ƒ, fissile; №, primarily a naturally occurring radioactive material (NORM); þ, neutron poison (thermal neutron capture cross section greater than 3k barns)
