= Isotopes of tin =

Isotopes of tin (_{50}Sn)
Main isotopes			Decay	
Isotope	abundance	half-life (t_{1/2})	mode	product
^{112}Sn	0.97%	stable		
^{113}Sn	synth	115.08 d	ε	^{113}In
^{114}Sn	0.66%	stable		
^{115}Sn	0.34%	stable		
^{116}Sn	14.5%	stable		
^{117}Sn	7.68%	stable		
^{118}Sn	24.2%	stable		
^{119}Sn	8.59%	stable		
^{120}Sn	32.6%	stable		
^{121m}Sn	synth	43.9 y	IT77.6%	^{121}Sn
^{121m}Sn	synth	43.9 y	β^{−}22.4%	^{121}Sb
^{122}Sn	4.63%	stable		
^{123}Sn	synth	129.2 d	β^{−}	^{123}Sb
^{124}Sn	5.79%	stable		
^{126}Sn	trace	2.3×10^{5} y	β^{−}	^{126}Sb

Standard atomic weight A_{r}°(Sn)
- 118.710±0.007; 118.71±0.01 (abridged)

Tin (_{50}Sn) is the element with the greatest number of naturally abundant isotopes, 10. Seven, ^{114-120}Sn, are theoretically stable, while the remaining three, ^{112}Sn, ^{122}Sn, and ^{124}Sn, are potentially radioactive to double beta decay, but no decay has been observed. This is generally attributed to the fact that 50 is a "magic number" of protons. In addition, 32 unstable tin isotopes are known, including tin-100 (^{100}Sn) and tin-132 (^{132}Sn), which are both "doubly magic". The longest-lived of these is tin-126 (^{126}Sn), with a half-life about 230,000 years; with all others less than a year and the majority under 20 minutes.

The number of known metastable states is very large, including a long series of low-lying states in odd isotopes from 117 on, which gives two nuclides with a longer life than any ground-state radioisotope other than 126: ^{121m}Sn, half-life 43.9 years, and ^{119m}Sn, half-life 293.1 days.

== List of isotopes ==
Nuclide (Note: ^{m}Sn – Excited nuclear isomer.)	Z	N	Isotopic mass (Da) (Note: ( ) – Uncertainty (1σ) is given in concise form in parentheses after the corresponding last digits.) (Note: # – Atomic mass marked #: value and uncertainty derived not from purely experimental data, but at least partly from trends from the Mass Surface (TMS).)	Discovery year	Half-life (Note: # – Values marked # are not purely derived from experimental data, but at least partly from trends of neighboring nuclides (TNN).)	Decay mode (Note: Modes of decay: EC: / Electron capture; IT: / Isomeric transition; n: / Neutron emission; p: / Proton emission)	Daughter isotope (Note: Bold symbol as daughter – Daughter product is stable.)	Spin and parity (Note: ( ) spin value – Indicates spin with weak assignment arguments.)	Natural abundance (mole fraction)	
Nuclide	Excitation energy			Discovery year	Half-life	Decay mode	Daughter isotope	Spin and parity	Normal proportion	Range of variation
^{98}Sn	50	48		2025				0+		
^{99}Sn (Note: Heaviest known nuclide with more protons than neutrons)	50	49	98.94850(63)#	2012	24(4) ms	β^{+} (95%)	^{99}In	9/2+#		
^{99}Sn	50	49	98.94850(63)#	2012	24(4) ms	β^{+}, p (5%)	^{98}Cd	9/2+#		
^{100}Sn (Note: Heaviest nuclide with equal numbers of protons and neutrons with no observed α decay)	50	50	99.93865(26)	1994	1.18(8) s	β^{+} (>83%)	^{100}In	0+		
^{100}Sn	50	50	99.93865(26)	1994	1.18(8) s	β^{+}, p (<17%)	^{99}Cd	0+		
^{101}Sn	50	51	100.93558(32)#	1994	2.22(5) s	β^{+}	^{101}In	(7/2+)		
^{101}Sn	50	51	100.93558(32)#	1994	2.22(5) s	β^{+}, p?	^{100}Cd	(7/2+)		
^{102}Sn	50	52	101.93029(11)	1994	3.8(2) s	β^{+}	^{102}In	0+		
^{102m}Sn	2017(2) keV			1996	367(8) ns	IT	^{102}Sn	(6+)		
^{103}Sn	50	53	102.927960(17)	1981	7.0(2) s	β^{+} (98.8%)	^{103}In	5/2+#		
^{103}Sn	50	53	102.927960(17)	1981	7.0(2) s	β^{+}, p (1.2%)	^{102}Cd	5/2+#		
^{104}Sn	50	54	103.923105(6)	1985	20.8(5) s	β^{+}	^{104}In	0+		
^{105}Sn	50	55	104.921268(4)	1981	32.7(5) s	β^{+}	^{105}In	(5/2+)		
^{105}Sn	50	55	104.921268(4)	1981	32.7(5) s	β^{+}, p (0.011%)	^{104}Cd	(5/2+)		
^{106}Sn	50	56	105.916957(5)	1975	1.92(8) min	β^{+}	^{106}In	0+		
^{107}Sn	50	57	106.915714(6)	1976	2.90(5) min	β^{+}	^{107}In	(5/2+)		
^{108}Sn	50	58	107.911894(6)	1968	10.30(8) min	β^{+}	^{108}In	0+		
^{109}Sn	50	59	108.911293(9)	1965	18.1(2) min	β^{+}	^{109}In	5/2+		
^{110}Sn	50	60	109.907845(15)	1965	4.154(4) h	EC	^{110}In	0+		
^{111}Sn	50	61	110.907741(6)	1949	35.3(6) min	β^{+}	^{111}In	7/2+		
^{111m}Sn	254.71(4) keV			1972	12.5(10) μs	IT	^{111}Sn	1/2+		
^{112}Sn	50	62	111.9048249(3)	1927	Observationally Stable (Note: Believed to decay by β^{+}β^{+} to ^{112}Cd)			0+	0.0097(1)	
^{113}Sn	50	63	112.9051759(17)	1939	115.08(4) d	β^{+}	^{113}In	1/2+		
^{113m}Sn	77.389(19) keV			1960	21.4(4) min	IT (91.1%)	^{113}Sn	7/2+		
^{113m}Sn	77.389(19) keV			1960	21.4(4) min	β^{+} (8.9%)	^{113}In	7/2+		
^{114}Sn	50	64	113.90278013(3)	1927	Stable			0+	0.0066(1)	
^{114m}Sn	3087.37(7) keV			1975	733(14) ns	IT	^{114}Sn	7−		
^{115}Sn (Note: Fission product)	50	65	114.903344695(16)	1927	Stable			1/2+	0.0034(1)	
^{115m1}Sn	612.81(4) keV			1967	3.26(8) μs	IT	^{115}Sn	7/2+		
^{115m2}Sn	713.64(12) keV			1964	159(1) μs	IT	^{115}Sn	11/2−		
^{116}Sn	50	66	115.90174283(10)	1922	Stable			0+	0.1454(9)	
^{116m1}Sn	2365.975(21) keV			1964	348(19) ns	IT	^{116}Sn	5−		
^{116m2}Sn	3547.16(17) keV			1975	833(30) ns	IT	^{116}Sn	10+		
^{117}Sn	50	67	116.90295404(52)	1922	Stable			1/2+	0.0768(7)	
^{117m1}Sn	314.58(4) keV			1950	13.939(24) d	IT	^{117}Sn	11/2−		
^{117m2}Sn	2406.4(4) keV			1979	1.75(7) μs	IT	^{117}Sn	(19/2+)		
^{118}Sn	50	68	117.90160663(54)	1922	Stable			0+	0.2422(9)	
^{118m1}Sn	2574.91(4) keV			1960	230(10) ns	IT	^{118}Sn	7−		
^{118m2}Sn	3108.06(22) keV			1980	2.52(6) μs	IT	^{118}Sn	(10+)		
^{119}Sn	50	69	118.90331127(78)	1922	Stable			1/2+	0.0859(4)	
^{119m1}Sn	89.531(13) keV			1950	293.1(7) d	IT	^{119}Sn	11/2−		
^{119m2}Sn	2127.0(10) keV			1992	9.6(12) μs	IT	^{119}Sn	(19/2+)		
^{119m3}Sn	2369.0(3) keV			2016	96(9) ns	IT	^{119}Sn	23/2+		
^{120}Sn	50	70	119.90220256(99)	1922	Stable			0+	0.3258(9)	
^{120m1}Sn	2481.63(6) keV			1958	11.8(5) μs	IT	^{120}Sn	7−		
^{120m2}Sn	2902.22(22) keV			1986	6.26(11) μs	IT	^{120}Sn	10+		
^{121}Sn	50	71	120.9042435(11)	1948	27.03(4) h	β^{−}	^{121}Sb	3/2+		
^{121m1}Sn	6.31(6) keV			1962	43.9(5) y	IT (77.6%)	^{121}Sn	11/2−		
^{121m1}Sn	6.31(6) keV			1962	43.9(5) y	β^{−} (22.4%)	^{121}Sb	11/2−		
^{121m2}Sn	1998.68(13) keV			1992	5.3(5) μs	IT	^{121}Sn	19/2+		
^{121m3}Sn	2222.0(2) keV			2012	520(50) ns	IT	^{121}Sn	23/2+		
^{121m4}Sn	2833.9(2) keV			2012	167(25) ns	IT	^{121}Sn	27/2−		
^{122}Sn	50	72	121.9034455(26)	1922	Observationally Stable (Note: Believed to undergo β^{−}β^{−} decay to ^{122}Te)			0+	0.0463(3)	
^{122m1}Sn	2409.03(4) keV			1979	7.5(9) μs	IT	^{122}Sn	7−		
^{122m2}Sn	2765.5(3) keV			1992	62(3) μs	IT	^{122}Sn	10+		
^{122m3}Sn	4721.2(3) keV			2012	139(9) ns	IT	^{122}Sn	15−		
^{123}Sn	50	73	122.9057271(27)	1948	129.2(4) d	β^{−}	^{123}Sb	11/2−		
^{123m1}Sn	24.6(4) keV			1948	40.06(1) min	β^{−}	^{123}Sb	3/2+		
^{123m2}Sn	1944.90(12) keV			1992	7.4(26) μs	IT	^{123}Sn	19/2+		
^{123m3}Sn	2152.66(19) keV			1994	6 μs	IT	^{123}Sn	23/2+		
^{123m4}Sn	2712.47(21) keV			1994	34 μs	IT	^{123}Sn	27/2−		
^{124}Sn	50	74	123.9052796(14)	1922	Observationally Stable (Note: Believed to undergo β^{−}β^{−} decay to ^{124}Te with a half-life over 1×10^{17} years)			0+	0.0579(5)	
^{124m1}Sn	2204.620(23) keV			1979	270(60) ns	IT	^{124}Sn	5-		
^{124m2}Sn	2324.96(4) keV			1979	3.1(5) μs	IT	^{124}Sn	7−		
^{124m3}Sn	2656.6(3) keV			1992	51(3) μs	IT	^{124}Sn	10+		
^{124m4}Sn	4552.4(3) keV			2012	260(25) ns	IT	^{124}Sn	15−		
^{125}Sn	50	75	124.9077894(14)	1939	9.634(15) d	β^{−}	^{125}Sb	11/2−		
^{125m1}Sn	27.50(14) keV			1949	9.77(25) min	β^{−}	^{125}Sb	3/2+		
^{125m2}Sn	1892.8(3) keV			2000	6.2(2) μs	IT	^{125}Sn	19/2+		
^{125m3}Sn	2059.5(4) keV			2008	650(60) ns	IT	^{125}Sn	23/2+		
^{125m4}Sn	2623.5(5) keV			2000	230(17) ns	IT	^{125}Sn	27/2−		
^{126}Sn (Note: Long-lived fission product)	50	76	125.907658(11)	1962	2.30(14)×10^{5} y	β^{−}	^{126m1}Sb	0+	< 10^{−14}	
^{126m1}Sn	2218.99(8) keV			1979	6.1(7) μs	IT	^{126}Sn	7−		
^{126m2}Sn	2564.5(5) keV			2000	7.6(3) μs	IT	^{126}Sn	10+		
^{126m3}Sn	4347.4(4) keV			2012	114(2) ns	IT	^{126}Sn	15−		
^{127}Sn	50	77	126.9103917(99)	1951	2.10(4) h	β^{−}	^{127}Sb	11/2−		
^{127m1}Sn	5.07(6) keV			1962	4.13(3) min	β^{−}	^{127}Sb	3/2+		
^{127m2}Sn	1826.67(16) keV			1980	4.52(15) μs	IT	^{127}Sn	19/2+		
^{127m3}Sn	1930.97(17) keV			2004	1.26(15) μs	IT	^{127}Sn	(23/2+)		
^{127m4}Sn	2552.4(10) keV			2008	250(30) ns	IT	^{127}Sn	(27/2−)		
^{128}Sn	50	78	127.910508(19)	1956	59.07(14) min	β^{−}	^{128}Sb	0+		
^{128m1}Sn	2091.50(11) keV			1979	6.5(5) s	IT	^{128}Sn	7−		
^{128m2}Sn	2491.91(17) keV			1981	2.91(14) μs	IT	^{128}Sn	10+		
^{128m3}Sn	4099.5(4) keV			2011	220(30) ns	IT	^{128}Sn	(15−)		
^{129}Sn	50	79	128.913482(19)	1962	2.23(4) min	β^{−}	^{129}Sb	3/2+		
^{129m1}Sn	35.15(5) keV			1966	6.9(1) min	β^{−}	^{129}Sb	11/2−		
^{129m2}Sn	1761.6(10) keV			1980	3.49(11) μs	IT	^{129}Sn	(19/2+)		
^{129m3}Sn	1802.6(10) keV			2002	2.22(13) μs	IT	^{129}Sn	23/2+		
^{129m4}Sn	2552.9(11) keV			2008	221(18) ns	IT	^{129}Sn	(27/2−)		
^{130}Sn	50	80	129.9139745(20)	1972	3.72(7) min	β^{−}	^{130}Sb	0+		
^{130m1}Sn	1946.88(10) keV			1974	1.7(1) min	β^{−}	^{130}Sb	7−		
^{130m2}Sn	2434.79(12) keV			1981	1.501(17) μs	IT	^{130}Sn	(10+)		
^{131}Sn	50	81	130.917053(4)	1963	56.0(5) s	β^{−}	^{131}Sb	3/2+		
^{131m1}Sn	65.1(3) keV			1977	58.4(5) s	β^{−}	^{131}Sb	11/2−		
^{131m1}Sn	65.1(3) keV			1977	58.4(5) s	IT?	^{131}Sn	11/2−		
^{131m2}Sn	4670.0(4) keV			1984	316(5) ns	IT	^{131}Sn	(23/2−)		
^{132}Sn	50	82	131.9178239(21)	1963	39.7(8) s	β^{−}	^{132}Sb	0+		
^{132m}Sn	4848.52(20) keV			1982	2.080(16) μs	IT	^{132}Sn	8+		
^{133}Sn	50	83	132.9239138(20)	1973	1.37(7) s	β^{−} (99.97%)	^{133}Sb	7/2−		
^{133}Sn	50	83	132.9239138(20)	1973	1.37(7) s	β^{−}n (.0294%)	^{132}Sb	7/2−		
^{134}Sn	50	84	133.928680(3)	1974	0.93(8) s	β^{−} (83%)	^{134}Sb	0+		
^{134}Sn	50	84	133.928680(3)	1974	0.93(8) s	β^{−}n (17%)	^{133}Sb	0+		
^{134m}Sn	1247.4(5) keV			(2000) (Note: Half-life shorter than 100ns, not included in discovery database)	87(8) ns	IT	^{134}Sn	6+		
^{135}Sn	50	85	134.934909(3)	1994	515(5) ms	β^{−} (79%)	^{135}Sb	7/2−#		
^{135}Sn	50	85	134.934909(3)	1994	515(5) ms	β^{−}n (21%)	^{134}Sb	7/2−#		
^{135}Sn	50	85	134.934909(3)	1994	515(5) ms	β^{−}2n?	^{133}Sb	7/2−#		
^{136}Sn	50	86	135.93970(22)#	1994	355(18) ms	β^{−} (72%)	^{136}Sb	0+		
^{136}Sn	50	86	135.93970(22)#	1994	355(18) ms	β^{−}n (28%)	^{135}Sb	0+		
^{136}Sn	50	86	135.93970(22)#	1994	355(18) ms	β^{−}2n?	^{134}Sb	0+		
^{137}Sn	50	87	136.94616(32)#	1994	249(15) ms	β^{−} (52%)	^{137}Sb	5/2−#		
^{137}Sn	50	87	136.94616(32)#	1994	249(15) ms	β^{−}n (48%)	^{136}Sb	5/2−#		
^{137}Sn	50	87	136.94616(32)#	1994	249(15) ms	β^{−}2n?	^{135}Sb	5/2−#		
^{138}Sn	50	88	137.95114(43)#	2010	148(9) ms	β^{−} (64%)	^{138}Sb	0+		
^{138}Sn	50	88	137.95114(43)#	2010	148(9) ms	β^{−}n (36%)	^{137}Sb	0+		
^{138}Sn	50	88	137.95114(43)#	2010	148(9) ms	β^{−}2n?	^{136}Sb	0+		
^{138m}Sn	1344(2) keV			2014	210(45) ns	IT	^{138}Sn	(6+)		
^{139}Sn	50	89	138.95780(43)#	2015	120(38) ms	β^{−}	^{139}Sb	5/2−#		
^{139}Sn	50	89	138.95780(43)#	2015	120(38) ms	β^{−}n?	^{138}Sb	5/2−#		
^{139}Sn	50	89	138.95780(43)#	2015	120(38) ms	β^{−}2n?	^{137}Sb	5/2−#		
^{140}Sn	50	90	139.96297(32)#	2018	50# ms [>550 ns]	β^{−}?	^{140}Sb	0+		
^{140}Sn	50	90	139.96297(32)#	2018	50# ms [>550 ns]	β^{−}n?	^{139}Sb	0+		
^{140}Sn	50	90	139.96297(32)#	2018	50# ms [>550 ns]	β^{−}2n?	^{138}Sb	0+		
This table header & footer:

== Tin-117m ==
Tin-117m is a radioisotope of tin. One of its uses is in a particulate suspension to treat canine synovitis (radiosynoviorthesis).

== Tin-121m ==
Medium-lived fission products
Nuclide	t_{1/2}	Yield	Q (Note: Decay energy is split among β, neutrino, and γ if any.)	βγ
	(a)	(%) (Note: Per 65 thermal neutron fissions of ^{235}U and 35 of ^{239}Pu.)	(keV)	
^{155}Eu	4.74	0.0803 (Note: Neutron poison; in thermal reactors, most is destroyed by further neutron capture.)	252	βγ
^{85}Kr	10.73	0.2180 (Note: Less than 1/4 of mass-85 fission products as most bypass ground state: ^{85}Br → ^{85m}Kr → ^{85}Rb.)	687	βγ
^{113m}Cd	13.9	0.0008	316	β
^{90}Sr	28.91	4.505	2826 (Note: Has decay energy 546 keV; its decay product ^{90}Y has decay energy 2.28 MeV with weak gamma branching.)	β
^{137}Cs	30.04	6.337	1176	βγ
^{121m}Sn	43.9	0.00005	390	βγ
^{151}Sm	94.6	0.5314	77	β

Tin-121m (^{121m}Sn) is a nuclear isomer of tin with a half-life of 43.9 years, making it technically a medium-lived fission product.

In a normal thermal reactor, it has a very low fission product yield; thus, this isotope is not a significant contributor to nuclear waste. Fast fission or fission of some heavier actinides will produce it at higher yields. For example, its yield from uranium-235 is 0.0007% per thermal fission and 0.002% per fast fission.

== Tin-126 ==
Long-lived fission products
Nuclide	t_{1/2}	Yield	Q (Note: Decay energy is split among β, neutrino, and γ if any.)	βγ
	(Ma)	(%) (Note: Per 65 thermal neutron fissions of ^{235}U and 35 of ^{239}Pu.)	(keV)	
^{99}Tc	0.211	6.1385	294	β
^{126}Sn	0.23	0.1084	4050 (Note: Has decay energy 380 keV, but its decay product ^{126}Sb has decay energy 3.67 MeV.)	βγ
^{79}Se	0.33	0.0447	151	β
^{135}Cs	1.33	6.9110 (Note: Lower in thermal reactors because ^{135}Xe, its predecessor, readily absorbs neutrons.)	269	β
^{93}Zr	1.61	5.4575	91	βγ
^{107}Pd	6.5	1.2499	33	β
^{129}I	16.1	0.8410	194	βγ

Tin-126 is a radioisotope of tin and one of the only seven long-lived fission products. While tin-126's half-life of 230,000 years means a relatively low specific activity, its short-lived decay products, two isomers of antimony-126, emit a cascade of hard gamma radiation - at least 3 photons above 400 keV per decay - before reaching stable tellurium-126, making it a possible external exposure hazard, which the other long-lived fission products are not by comparison.

Tin-126 is in the middle of the mass range for fission products, so its yield is fairly low (but still dominates that for the element tin). Fission of the common fuels such as ^{235}U and ^{239}Pu into unequal halves is preferred, especially with thermal neutrons, as used in almost all current nuclear power plants.

- ANL factsheet

Yield, % per fission
	Thermal	Fast	14 MeV
^{232}Th	not fissile	0.0481 ± 0.0077	0.87 ± 0.20
^{233}U	0.224 ± 0.018	0.278 ± 0.022	1.92 ± 0.31
^{235}U	0.056 ± 0.004	0.0137 ± 0.001	1.70 ± 0.14
^{238}U	not fissile	0.054 ± 0.004	1.31 ± 0.21
^{239}Pu	0.199 ± 0.016	0.26 ± 0.02	2.02 ± 0.22
^{241}Pu	0.082 ± 0.019	0.22 ± 0.03	?

== See also ==
Daughter products other than tin

- Isotopes of antimony
- Isotopes of indium
- Isotopes of cadmium
