= Technetium-99 =

Radioactive isotope produced by fission of uranium

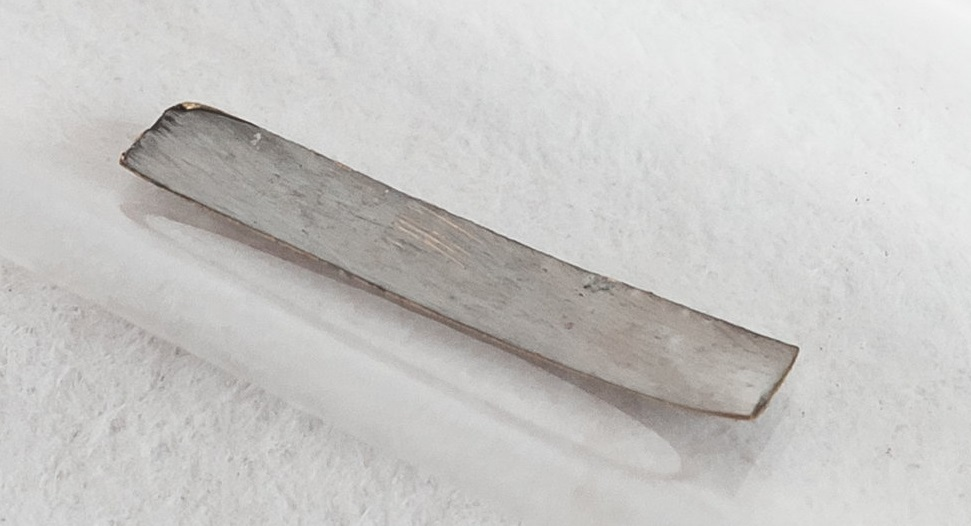

General
- Symbol: ^{99}Tc
- Names: technetium-99
- Protons (Z): 43
- Neutrons (N): 56

Nuclide data
- Natural abundance: trace
- Half-life (t_{1/2}): 211100±1200 years
- Spin: 9/2+
- Excess energy: −87327.9±0.9 keV
- Nuclear binding energy: 8613.610±0.009 keV
- Decay products: ^{99}Ru

Decay modes
- Decay mode: Decay energy (MeV)
- Beta decay: 0.2975

Technetium-99 (^{99}Tc) is an isotope of technetium that decays with a half-life of 211,000 years to stable ruthenium-99, emitting beta particles, but effectively no gamma rays. It is the most significant long-lived fission product of uranium fission, and the largest single contributor to the long-lived radioactivity of nuclear waste. Technetium-99 has a fission product yield of 6.0507% for thermal neutron fission of uranium-235.

The metastable technetium-99m (^{99m}Tc) is a short-lived (half-life about 6 hours) nuclear isomer used in nuclear medicine, produced from molybdenum-99. It decays by isomeric transition to technetium-99, a desirable characteristic, since the very long half-life and type of decay of technetium-99 imposes little further radiation burden on the body.

== Radiation ==
The weak beta emission is stopped by the walls of laboratory glassware. Soft X-rays are emitted when the beta particles are stopped, but as long as the body is kept more than 30 cm away these should pose no problem. The primary hazard when working with technetium is inhalation of dust; such radioactive contamination in the lungs can pose a significant cancer risk.

== Role in nuclear waste ==
Yield, % per fission
	Thermal	Fast	14 MeV
^{232}Th	not fissile	2.919 ± .076	1.953 ± 0.098
^{233}U	5.03 ± 0.14	4.85 ± 0.17	3.87 ± 0.22
^{235}U	6.132 ± 0.092	5.80 ± 0.13	5.02 ± 0.13
^{238}U	not fissile	6.181 ± 0.099	5.737 ± 0.040
^{239}Pu	6.185 ± 0.056	5.82 ± 0.13	?
^{241}Pu	5.61 ± 0.25	4.1 ± 2.3	?

Due to its high fission yield, relatively long half-life, and mobility in the environment, technetium-99 is one of the more significant components of nuclear waste. Measured in becquerels per amount of spent fuel, it is the dominant producer of radiation in the period from about 10^{4} to 10^{6} years after the creation of the nuclear waste. The next shortest-lived fission product is samarium-151 with a half-life of 94.6 years, though a number of actinides produced by neutron capture have half-lives in the intermediate range.

== Releases ==
Long-lived fission products
Nuclide	t_{1/2}	Yield	Q (Note: Decay energy is split among β, neutrino, and γ if any.)	βγ
	(Ma)	(%) (Note: Per 65 thermal neutron fissions of ^{235}U and 35 of ^{239}Pu.)	(keV)	
^{99}Tc	0.211	6.1385	294	β
^{126}Sn	0.23	0.1084	4050 (Note: Has decay energy 380 keV, but its decay product ^{126}Sb has decay energy 3.67 MeV.)	βγ
^{79}Se	0.33	0.0447	151	β
^{135}Cs	1.33	6.9110 (Note: Lower in thermal reactors because ^{135}Xe, its predecessor, readily absorbs neutrons.)	269	β
^{93}Zr	1.61	5.4575	91	βγ
^{107}Pd	6.5	1.2499	33	β
^{129}I	16.1	0.8410	194	βγ

An estimated 160 TBq (about 250 kg) of technetium-99 was released into the environment by atmospheric nuclear tests. The amount of technetium-99 from civilian nuclear power released into the environment up to 1986 is estimated to be on the order of 1000 TBq (about 1600 kg), primarily by outdated methods of nuclear fuel reprocessing; most of this was discharged into the sea. In recent years, reprocessing methods have improved to reduce emissions, but the Sellafield plant, which operated until 2022, released an estimated 550 TBq (about 900 kg) from 1995–1999 into the Irish Sea; afterward the amount was limited by regulation to 90 TBq (about 140 kg) per year.

== In the environment ==
The long half-life of technetium-99 and its ability to form an anionic species make it (along with ^{129}I) a major concern when considering long-term disposal of high-level radioactive waste. Many of the processes designed to remove fission products from medium-active process streams in reprocessing plants are designed to remove cationic species like caesium (e.g., ^{137}Cs, ^{134}Cs) and strontium (e.g., ^{90}Sr). Hence the pertechnetate escapes through these treatment processes. Disposal options favor burial in geologically stable rock. The primary danger with such a course is that the waste is likely to come into contact with water, which could leach radioactive contamination into the environment. The natural cation-exchange capacity of soils tends to immobilize plutonium, uranium, and caesium cations. However, the anion-exchange capacity is usually much smaller, so minerals are less likely to adsorb the pertechnetate and iodide anions, leaving them mobile in the soil. For this reason, the environmental chemistry of technetium is an active area of research.

== Separation of technetium-99 ==
Several methods have been proposed for technetium-99 separation, including crystallization, liquid-liquid extraction, molecular recognition methods, volatilization, and others.

In 2012 the crystalline compound Notre Dame Thorium Borate-1 (NDTB-1) was presented by researchers at the University of Notre Dame. It can be tailored to safely absorb radioactive ions from nuclear waste streams. Once captured, the radioactive ions can then be exchanged for higher-charged species of a similar size, recycling the material for re-use. Lab results using the NDTB-1 crystals removed approximately 96 percent of technetium-99.

== Transmutation of technetium to stable ruthenium-100 ==
Technetium (Tc) can be completely transformed into ruthenium-100 by coating the inner cladding of fuel rods with Tc. This works with conventional pressurized water reactors and does not require specialized transmutation facilities.

An alternative disposal method, transmutation, has been demonstrated at CERN and NIIAR for technetium-99. This transmutation process bombards the technetium (^{99}Tc as a metal target) with neutrons, forming the short-lived ^{100}Tc (half-life 16 seconds), which decays by beta decay to stable ruthenium (^{100}Ru). Given the relatively high market value of ruthenium and the particularly undesirable properties of technetium, this type of nuclear transmutation appears particularly promising.

== See also ==
- Isotopes of technetium
- List of elements facing shortage
- Long-lived fission product
- Nuclear transmutation
- Technetium-99m
