= Plutonium-244 =

Isotope of plutonium

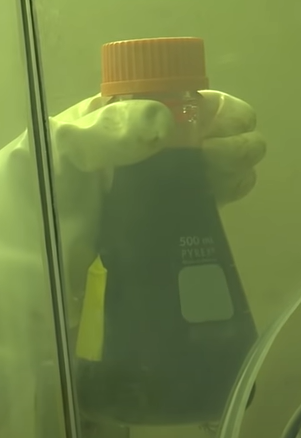
- A concentrated solution of plutonium-244

General
- Symbol: ^{244}Pu
- Names: plutonium-244
- Protons (Z): 94
- Neutrons (N): 150

Nuclide data
- Natural abundance: Trace
- Half-life (t_{1/2}): 8.13×10^{7} years
- Isotope mass: 244.0642044 Da
- Spin: 0+
- Parent isotopes: ^{248}Cm (α)^{244}Np (β^{−})
- Decay products: ^{240}U

Decay modes
- Decay mode: Decay energy (MeV)
- α (99.877%): 4.666
- SF (0.123%)

Plutonium-244 (^{244}Pu) is an isotope of plutonium that has a half-life of 81.3 million years. This is longer than any other isotope of plutonium and longer than any other known isotope of an element beyond bismuth, except for the three naturally abundant ones: uranium-235 (704 million years), uranium-238 (4.463 billion years), and thorium-232 (14.0 billion years). Given the half-life of ^{244}Pu, an exceedingly small amount should still be present on Earth, making plutonium a likely but unproven candidate as the shortest-lived primordial element.

== Natural occurrence ==
Accurate measurements, beginning in the early 1970s, appeared to detect primordial plutonium-244, making it the shortest-lived primordial nuclide. As the age of the Earth is about 56 half-lives of ^{244}Pu, the amount of ^{244}Pu left should be very small; Hoffman et al. estimated its content in the rare-earth mineral bastnasite as c_{244} = 1.0×10^{−18} g/g, which corresponded to the content in the Earth crust as low as 3×10^{−25} g/g (i.e. the total mass of plutonium-244 in Earth's crust is about 9 g). Since ^{244}Pu cannot be easily produced by natural neutron capture in the low neutron activity environment of uranium ores (see below), its presence cannot plausibly be explained by any other means than creation by r-process nucleosynthesis in supernovae or neutron star mergers.

However, the detection of primordial ^{244}Pu in 1971 is not confirmed by recent, more sensitive measurements using accelerator mass spectrometry. In a 2012 study, no traces of ^{244}Pu in the samples of bastnasite (taken from the same mine as in the early study) were observed, so only an upper limit on the ^{244}Pu content was obtained: c_{244} < 1.5×10^{−19} g/g: 370 (or fewer) atoms per gram of the sample, at least seven times lower than the abundance measured by Hoffman et al. A 2022 study, once again using accelerator mass spectrometry, could not detect ^{244}Pu in Bayan Obo bastnasite, finding an upper limit of < 2.1×10^{−20} g/g (about seven times lower than the 2012 study). Thus, the 1971 detection cannot have been a signal of primordial ^{244}Pu. Considering the likely abundance ratio of ^{244}Pu to ^{238}U in the early solar system (~0.008), this upper limit is still 18 times greater than the expected present ^{244}Pu content in the bastnasite sample (1.2×10^{−21} g/g).

Live interstellar plutonium-244 has been detected in meteorite dust in marine sediments, though the levels detected are much lower than would be expected from current modelling of the in-fall from the interstellar medium. Trace amounts of ^{244}Pu were also found in rock from the Pacific ocean by a Japanese oil exploration company. It is important to recall, however, that in order to be a primordial nuclide – one whose origin lay in the amalgam orbiting the Sun that ultimately coalesced into the Earth – the plutonium-244 must have comprised some of the solar nebula, rather than having been replenished by extrasolar meteoritic dust.

=== As an extinct radionuclide ===
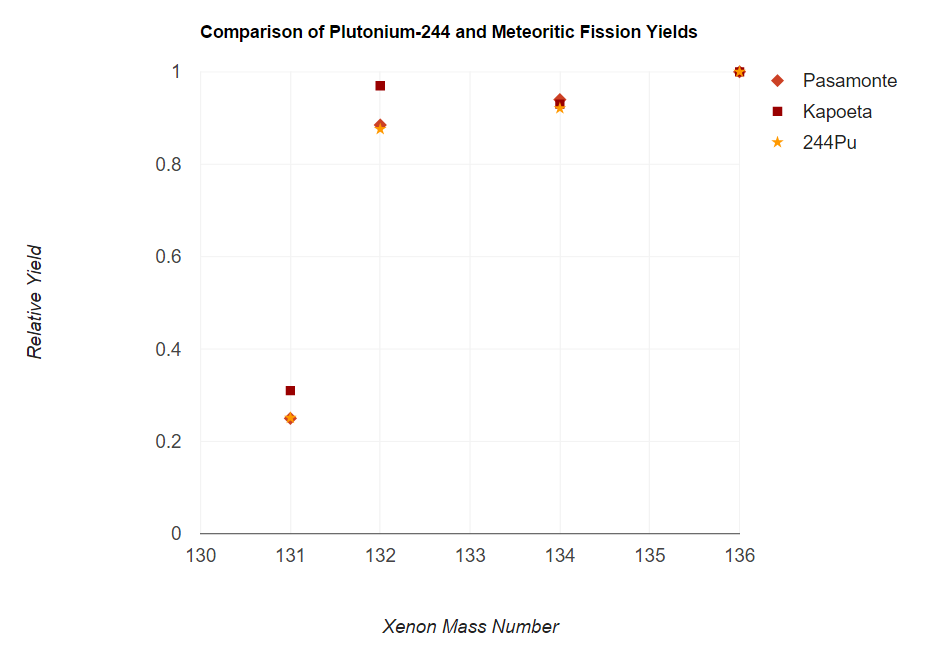
A comparison of the relative fissiogenic xenon yields found in the meteorites Pasamonte and Kapoeta with those of a laboratory sample of plutonium-244.

Plutonium-244 is one of several extinct radionuclides that preceded the formation of the Solar System. Its half-life of 81.3 million years ensured its circulation across the Solar System before its extinction, and so evidence of it should also be found throughout the Solar System. Radionuclides such as ^{244}Pu, decay to produce fissiogenic (i.e., arising from fission) xenon isotopes that can then be used to time the events of the early Solar System. In fact, by analyzing data from Earth's mantle which indicates that about 30% of existing fissiogenic xenon is from ^{244}Pu decay, it can be inferred that the Earth formed nearly 50–70 million years after the Solar System formed.

Before the analysis of mass spectroscopy data from analyzing samples found in meteorites, it was inferential at best to credit ^{244}Pu as being the nuclide responsible for the fissiogenic xenon found. However, an analysis of a laboratory sample of ^{244}Pu compared with that of fissiogenic xenon gathered from the meteorites Pasamonte and Kapoeta produced matching spectra that immediately left little doubt as to the source of the isotopic xenon anomalies. Spectra data was further acquired for another actinide isotope, ^{244}Cm, but such data proved contradictory and helped erase further doubts that the fission was appropriately attributed to ^{244}Pu.

Both the examination of spectra data and study of fission tracks led to several findings of plutonium-244. In Western Australia, the analysis of the mass spectrum of xenon in 4.1–4.2-billion-year-old zircons was met with findings of diverse levels of ^{244}Pu fission. Presence of ^{244}Pu fission tracks can be established by using the initial ratio of ^{244}Pu to ^{238}U (Pu/U)_{0} at a time T_{0} = 4.58×10^{9} years, when Xe formation first began in meteorites, and by considering how the ratio of Pu/U fission tracks varies over time. Examination of a whitlockite crystal within a lunar rock specimen brought by Apollo 14, established proportions of Pu/U fission tracks consistent with the (Pu/U)_{0} time dependence.

Plutonium-244 is not detected from its decay products, as other extinct radionuclides are, as it would have become thorium-232, the only primordial isotope of its elements and so undetectable from isotopic analysis.

== Production ==
Unlike plutonium-238, plutonium-239, plutonium-240, plutonium-241, and plutonium-242, plutonium-244 is not produced in quantity by the nuclear fuel cycle, because further neutron capture on plutonium-242 produces plutonium-243 which has a short half-life (~5 hours) and quickly beta decays to americium-243 before having much opportunity to further capture neutrons in any but very high neutron flux environments. The global inventory of ^{244}Pu is about 20 grams. Plutonium-244 is also a minor constituent of thermonuclear fallout, with a global ^{244}Pu/^{239}Pu fallout ratio of (5.7 ± 1.0) × 10^{−5}.

== Applications ==
Plutonium-244 is used as an internal standard for isotope dilution mass spectrometry analysis of plutonium.
