= Naturally occurring radioactive material =

Naturally occurring radioactive materials (NORM) and technologically enhanced naturally occurring radioactive materials (TENORM) consist of materials, usually industrial wastes or by-products enriched with radioactive elements found in the environment, such as uranium, thorium and potassium-40 (a long-lived beta emitter that is part of natural potassium on earth) and any of the products of the decay chains of the former two, such as radium and radon. Produced water discharges and spills are a good example of entering NORMs into the surrounding environment.

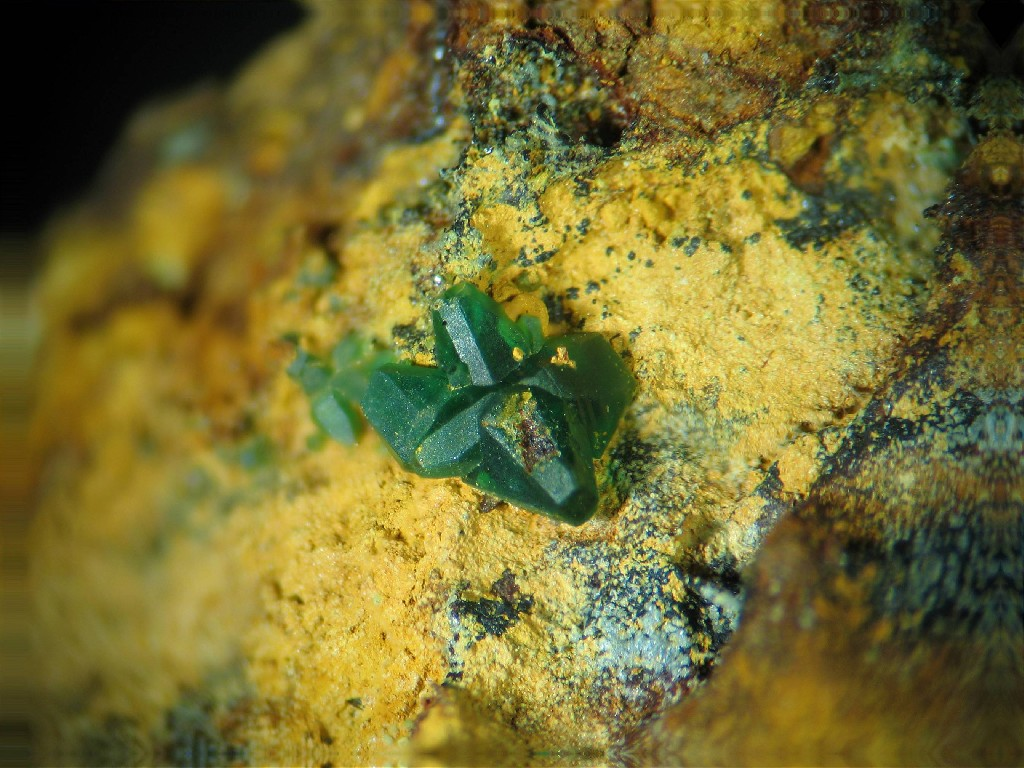
Torbernite is an example of a naturally occurring and radioactive uranium mineral.

Natural radioactive elements are present in very low concentrations in Earth's crust, and are brought to the surface through human activities such as oil and gas exploration, drilling for geothermal energy or mining, and through natural processes like leakage of radon gas to the atmosphere or through dissolution in ground water. Another example of TENORM is coal ash produced from coal burning in power plants. If radioactivity is much higher than background level, handling TENORM may cause problems in many industries and transportation. If a mineral has naturally occurring radioactive material present, the tailings may have a higher concentration of radioactive substance than the ore had. By mass perhaps the biggest example of such material is phosphogypsum where radium-sulfate is left with the gypsum that results from treating apatite with sulfuric acid to extract phosphoric acid. Another example is in rare earth-mining where ores such as monazite may contain thorium and its decay products which are subsequently found enriched in the tailings.

== NORM in oil and gas exploration ==
Oil and gas TENORM and/or NORM is created in the production process, when produced fluids from reservoirs carry sulfates up to the surface of the Earth's crust. Some states, such as North Dakota, use the term "diffuse NORM". Barium, calcium and strontium sulfates are larger compounds, and the smaller atoms, such as radium-226 and radium-228, can fit into the empty spaces of the compound and be carried through the produced fluids. As the fluids approach the surface, changes in the temperature and pressure cause the barium, calcium, strontium and radium sulfates to precipitate out of solution and form scale on the inside, or on occasion, the outside of the tubulars and/or casing. The use of tubulars in the production process that are NORM contaminated does not cause a health hazard if the scale is inside the tubulars and the tubulars remain downhole. Enhanced concentrations of the radium 226 and 228 and the daughter products such as lead-210 may also occur in sludge that accumulates in oilfield pits, tanks and lagoons. Radon gas in the natural gas streams concentrate as NORM in gas processing activities. Radon decays to lead-210, then to bismuth-210, polonium-210 and stabilizes with lead-206. Radon decay elements occur as a shiny film on the inner surface of inlet lines, treating units, pumps and valves associated with propylene, ethane and propane processing systems.

NORM characteristics vary depending on the nature of the waste. NORM may be created in a crystalline form, which is brittle and thin, and can cause flaking to occur in tubulars. NORM formed in carbonate matrix can have a density of 3.5 grams/cubic centimeters and must be noted when packing for transportation. NORM scales may be white or a brown solid, or thick sludge to solid, dry flaky substances. NORM may also be found in oil and gas production produced waters.

Cutting and reaming oilfield pipe, removing solids from tanks and pits, and refurbishing gas processing equipment may expose employees to particles containing increased levels of alpha emitting radionuclides that could pose health risks if inhaled or ingested.

NORM is found in many industries including

- The coal industry (mining and combustion)
- Metal mining and smelting
- Mineral sands (rare earth minerals, titanium and zirconium).
- Fertilizer (phosphate) industry
- Building industry

== NORM in construction materials ==
Naturally occurring radioactive materials (NORM) occur in a range of construction materials, including cement, concrete, bricks, ceramics and other mineral-based products. These materials can contain naturally occurring radionuclides, particularly ^{238}U, ^{232}Th and ^{40}K. Their concentrations vary according to the composition and origin of the material and can be relevant to the assessment of radiation exposure and the use of materials containing industrial or mineral residues in construction.

A database developed within the HORRADIONEX project provides chemical composition and natural radionuclide activity-concentration data for construction materials and materials that may be used as supplementary cementitious materials (SCMs). The dataset includes 162 samples collected between 2020 and 2025 in Spain, Italy, China, Morocco, the Czech Republic, France and Portugal. Chemical composition was determined by X-ray fluorescence, while radionuclide activity concentrations were measured by high-resolution gamma spectroscopy.

The database provides data that can be used to characterize and compare natural radioactivity in construction materials and potential alternative raw materials. Such information can support assessments of materials containing industrial, mining or other residues for potential use in construction in accordance with applicable radiation-protection requirements.

== Hazards ==
The hazards associated with NORM are inhalation and ingestion routes of entry as well as external exposure where there has been a significant accumulation of scales. Respirators may be necessary in dry processes, where NORM scales and dust become air borne and have a significant chance to enter the body.

The hazardous elements found in NORM are radium-226 (^{226}Ra), radium-228 (^{228}Ra), and radon-222 (^{222}Rn) and also daughter products from these radionuclides. The elements are referred to as "bone seekers" which when inside the body migrate to the bone tissue and concentrate. This exposure can cause bone cancers and other bone abnormalities. The concentration of radium and other daughter products build over time, with several years of excessive exposures. Therefore, from a liability standpoint an employee that has not had respiratory protection over several years could develop bone or other cancers from NORM exposure and decide to seek compensation such as medical expenses and lost wages from the oil company which generated the TENORM and the employer.

Radium radionuclides emit alpha and beta particles as well as gamma rays. The radiation emitted from a radium 226 atom is 96% alpha particles and 4% gamma rays. The alpha particle is not the most dangerous particle associated with NORM, as an external hazard. Alpha particles are identical with helium-4 nuclei. Alpha particles travel short distances in air, of only 2–3 cm, and cannot penetrate through a dead layer of skin on the human body. However, radium is a "bone seeker" due to radium being chemically similar to calcium. In the case that radium atoms are not expelled from the body, they concentrate in areas where calcium ions are prevalent, such as bone tissue. The half-life for radium 226 is approximately 1,620 years, and will remain in the body for the lifetime of the human — a significant length of time to cause damage.

Beta particles are electrons or positrons and can travel farther than alpha particles in air. They are in the middle of the scale in terms of ionizing potential and penetrating power, being stopped by a few millimeters of plastic. This radiation is a small portion of the total emitted during radium-226 decay. Radium-228 emits beta particles, and is also a concern for human health through inhalation and ingestion.

The gamma rays emitted from radium-226, accounting for 4% of the radiation, are harmful to humans with sufficient exposure. Gamma rays are highly penetrating and some can pass through metals, so Geiger counters or a scintillation probe are used to measure gamma ray exposures when monitoring for NORM.

Alpha and beta particles are harmful once inside the body. Breathing NORM contaminates from dusts should be prevented by wearing respirators with particulate filters. In the case of properly trained occupational NORM workers, air monitoring and analysis may be necessary. These measurements, ALI and DAC, are calculated values based on the dose an average employee working 2,000 hours a year may be exposed to. The current legal limit exposure in the United States is 1 ALI, or 5 rems. A rem, or roentgen equivalent man, is a measurement of absorption of radiation on parts of the body over an extended period of time. A DAC is a concentration of alpha and beta particles that an average working employee is exposed to for 2,000 hours of light work. If an employee is exposed to over 10% of an ALI, 500 mREM, then the employee's dose must be documented under instructions with federal and state regulations.

== Regulation ==
=== United States ===
NORM is not federally regulated in the United States. The Nuclear Regulatory Commission (NRC) has jurisdiction over a relatively narrow spectrum of radiation, and the Environmental Protection Agency (EPA) has jurisdiction over NORM. Since no federal entity has implemented NORM regulations, NORM is variably regulated by the states.

=== United Kingdom ===
In the UK regulation is via the Environmental Permitting (England and Wales) Regulations 2010.

This defines two types of NORM activity:

- Type 1 NORM industrial activity means:

(a) the production and use of thorium, or thorium compounds, and the production of products where thorium is deliberately added; or

(b) the production and use of uranium or uranium compounds, and the production of products where uranium is deliberately added

- Type 2 NORM industrial activity means:

(a) the extraction, production and use of rare earth elements and rare earth element alloys;

(b) the mining and processing of ores other than uranium ore;

(c) the production of oil and gas;

(d) the removal and management of radioactive scales and precipitates from equipment associated with industrial activities;

(e) any industrial activity utilising phosphate ore;

(f) the manufacture of titanium dioxide pigments;

(g) the extraction and refining of zircon and manufacture of zirconium compounds;

(h) the production of tin, copper, aluminium, zinc, lead and iron and steel;

(i) any activity related to coal mine de-watering plants;

(j) china clay extraction;

(k) water treatment associated with provision of drinking water;

or (l) The remediation of contamination from any type 1 NORM industrial activity or any of the activities listed above.

An activity which involves the processing of radionuclides of natural terrestrial or cosmic origin for their radioactive, fissile or fertile properties is not a type 1 NORM industrial activity or a type 2 NORM industrial activity.

== See also ==
- Background radiation, ionizing radiation constantly present in the natural environment of the Earth
- Environmental radioactivity
