= Radium-226 =

Isotope of radium

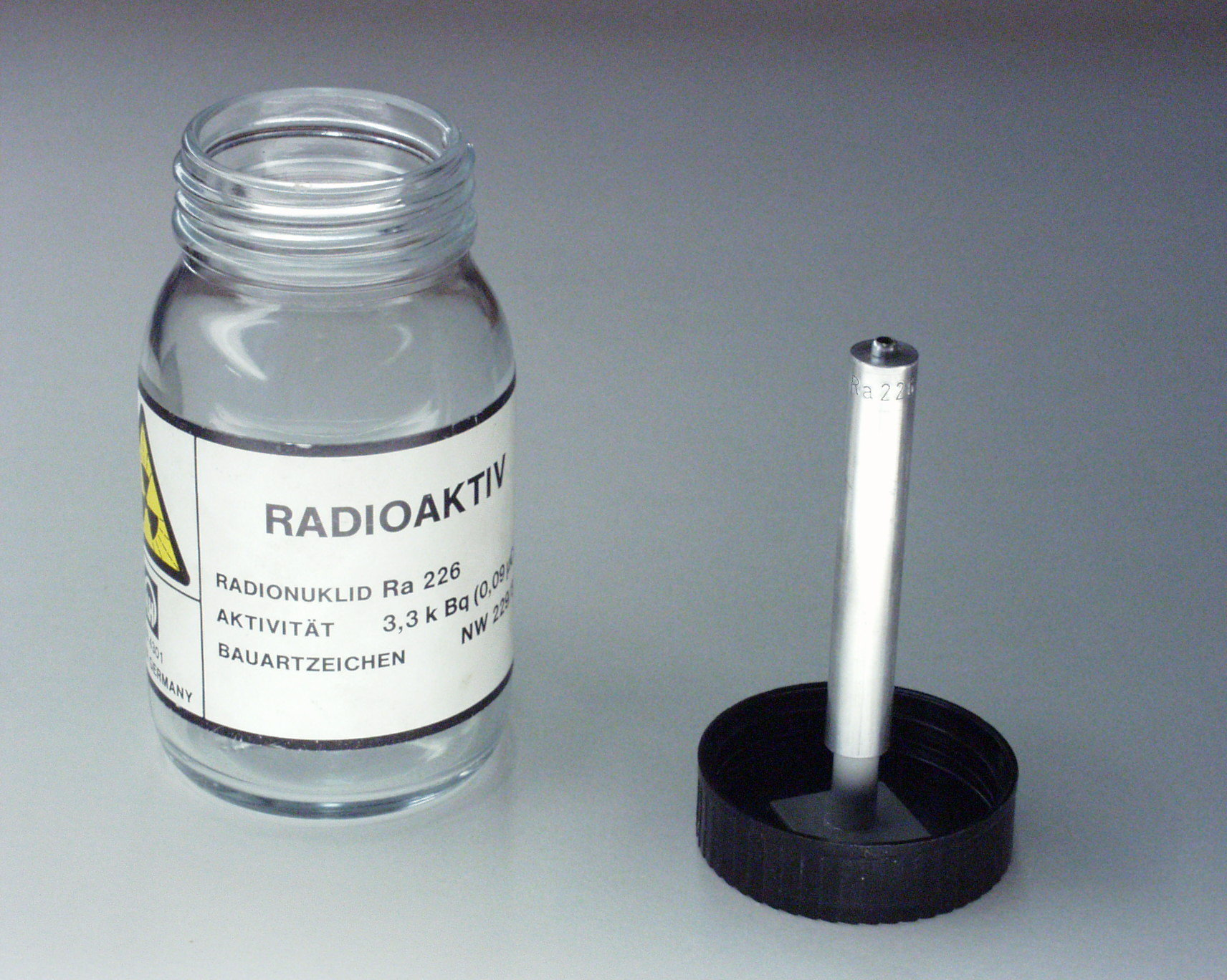

General
- Symbol: ^{226}Ra
- Names: radium-226
- Protons (Z): 88
- Neutrons (N): 138

Nuclide data
- Natural abundance: trace
- Half-life (t_{1/2}): 1600±7 years
- Isotope mass: 226.0254082(21) Da
- Spin: 0+
- Parent isotopes: ^{230}Th (α)^{226}Fr (β^{−})
- Decay products: ^{222}Rn

Decay modes
- Decay mode: Decay energy (MeV)
- alpha decay: 4.871

Radium-226 (^{226}Ra) is the longest-lived isotope of radium, with a half-life of 1600 years. It is an intermediate product in the decay chain of uranium-238; as such, it can be found naturally in uranium-containing minerals.

== Occurrence and decay ==
The decay-chain of uranium-238, which contains radium-226 as an intermediate decay product

^{226}Ra occurs in the decay chain of uranium-238 (^{238}U), which is the most common naturally occurring isotope of uranium. It undergoes alpha decay to radon-222, which is also radioactive; the decay chain ultimately terminates at lead-206.

Because of its occurrence in the ^{238}U decay chain, ^{226}Ra exists naturally at low concentrations not only in uranium-containing minerals, but universally diffused in the environment (as also is uranium), as in soil and groundwater.

== Historical uses ==
Following its discovery by Marie and Pierre Curie in 1898, radium (principally ^{226}Ra) has had a number of uses. In the early 20th century, when the hazards of radiation were not well-known, radium was commonly used in consumer items such as toothpaste and hair creams. Radium was also formerly used as a radiation source for cancer treatment, but has since been replaced in this role by safer and more easily available alternatives. Until the 1960s, radium was used in luminous paint for watch dials and aircraft instruments.

== Hazards ==
As a radioactive material, ^{226}Ra and its decay products can present serious health hazards. Factory workers who worked with radium-containing luminous paint, known as the Radium Girls, often licked the tips of their paintbrushes in order to produce a finer point. In doing so, the workers ingested some of the radioactive paint; this eventually led to serious health problems including cancer, bone damage, and anemia. Several of these workers died from illnesses caused by radium exposure.

Many rocks and soils contain low concentrations of ^{226}Ra, which forms from the radioactive decay of naturally occurring uranium. The decay of ^{226}Ra produces radon-222, a radioactive gas that can accumulate in inadequately ventilated homes and other enclosed spaces. Radon exposure is the second leading cause of lung cancer in the United States.
