= Isotopes of americium =

Isotopes of americium (_{95}Am)
Main isotopes			Decay	
Isotope	abundance	half-life (t_{1/2})	mode	product
^{241}Am	trace	432.6 y	α	^{237}Np
^{241}Am	trace	432.6 y	SF	–
^{242}Am	synth	16.02 h	β^{−}	^{242}Cm
^{242}Am	synth	16.02 h	ε	^{242}Pu
^{242m1}Am	synth	141 y	IT	^{242}Am
^{242m1}Am	synth	141 y	α	^{238}Np
^{243}Am	synth	7350 y	α	^{239}Np
^{243}Am	synth	7350 y	SF	–

Americium (_{95}Am) is an artificial element, and thus a standard atomic weight cannot be given. Like all artificial elements, it has no known stable isotopes. The first isotope to be synthesized was ^{241}Am in 1944. The artificial element decays by ejecting alpha particles. Americium has an atomic number of 95 (the number of protons in the nucleus of the americium atom). Despite ^{243}Am being an order of magnitude longer lived than ^{241}Am, the former is harder to obtain than the latter as more of it is present in spent nuclear fuel.

Nineteen radioisotopes of americium, ranging from ^{229}Am to ^{247}Am have been characterized; another isotope, ^{223}Am, has also been reported but is unconfirmed. The most stable isotopes are ^{243}Am with a half-life of 7,350 years and ^{241}Am with a half-life of 432.6 years. All of the remaining radioactive isotopes have half-lives that are less than seven days, the majority of which are shorter than two hours. This element also has fourteen meta states, with the most stable being ^{242m1}Am (half-life 141 years). This isomer is unusual in that its half-life is far longer than that of the ground state of the same isotope.

== List of isotopes ==
Nuclide (Note: ^{m}Am – Excited nuclear isomer.)	Z	N	Isotopic mass (Da) (Note: ( ) – Uncertainty (1σ) is given in concise form in parentheses after the corresponding last digits.) (Note: # – Atomic mass marked #: value and uncertainty derived not from purely experimental data, but at least partly from trends from the Mass Surface (TMS).)	Discovery year	Half-life	Decay mode (Note: Modes of decay: EC: / Electron capture; CD: / Cluster decay; IT: / Isomeric transition; SF: / Spontaneous fission)	Daughter isotope	Spin and parity (Note: ( ) spin value – Indicates spin with weak assignment arguments.) (Note: # – Values marked # are not purely derived from experimental data, but at least partly from trends of neighboring nuclides (TNN).)
Nuclide	Excitation energy			Discovery year	Half-life	Decay mode	Daughter isotope	Spin and parity
^{223}Am (Note: The discovery of this isotope is uncertain due to disagreements between theoretical predictions and reported experimental data.)	95	128	223.04584(32)#	2015	10(9) ms	α	^{219}Np	9/2–#
^{229}Am	95	134	229.04528(11)	2015	1.8(15) s	α	^{225}Np	5/2–#
^{230}Am	95	135	230.04603(15)#	2016	40(9) s	β^{+} (<70%)	^{230}Pu	1–#
^{230}Am	95	135	230.04603(15)#	2016	40(9) s	β^{+}, SF (>30%)	(various)	1–#
^{231}Am	95	136	231.04553(32)#	2026	75+137 −30 s	β^{+} (~83%)	^{231}Pu	5/2–#
^{231}Am	95	136	231.04553(32)#	2026	75+137 −30 s	α (~17%)	^{227}Np	5/2–#
^{232}Am	95	137	232.04661(32)#	1967	1.31(4) min	β^{+} (97%)	^{232}Pu	1–#
^{232}Am	95	137	232.04661(32)#	1967	1.31(4) min	α (3%)	^{228}Np	1–#
^{232}Am	95	137	232.04661(32)#	1967	1.31(4) min	β^{+}, SF (0.069%)	(various)	1–#
^{233}Am	95	138	233.04647(12)#	2000	3.2(8) min	β^{+} (95.5%)	^{233}Pu	5/2–#
^{233}Am	95	138	233.04647(12)#	2000	3.2(8) min	α (4.5%)	^{229}Np	5/2–#
^{234}Am	95	139	234.04773(17)#	1967	2.32(8) min	β^{+} (99.95%)	^{234}Pu	0–#
^{234}Am	95	139	234.04773(17)#	1967	2.32(8) min	α (0.039%)	^{230}Np	0–#
^{234}Am	95	139	234.04773(17)#	1967	2.32(8) min	β^{+}, SF (0.0066%)	(various)	0–#
^{235}Am	95	140	235.04791(6)	1996	10.3(6) min	β^{+} (99.60%)	^{235}Pu	5/2−#
^{235}Am	95	140	235.04791(6)	1996	10.3(6) min	α (0.40%)	^{231}Np	5/2−#
^{236}Am	95	141	236.04943(13)#	1998	3.6(1) min	β^{+}	^{236}Pu	5−
^{236}Am	95	141	236.04943(13)#	1998	3.6(1) min	α (4×10^{−3}%)	^{232}Np	5−
^{236m}Am	50(50)# keV			2004	2.9(2) min	β^{+}	^{236}Pu	(1−)
^{237}Am	95	142	237.05000(6)#	1970	73.6(8) min	β^{+} (99.975%)	^{237}Pu	5/2−
^{237}Am	95	142	237.05000(6)#	1970	73.6(8) min	α (0.025%)	^{233}Np	5/2−
^{238}Am	95	143	238.05198(6)	1950	98(3) min	β^{+}	^{238}Pu	1+
^{238}Am	95	143	238.05198(6)	1950	98(3) min	α (1.0×10^{−4}%)	^{234}Np	1+
^{238m}Am	2500(200)# keV			1967	35(18) μs	SF	(various)	
^{239}Am	95	144	239.0530227(21)	1949	11.9(1) h	EC (99.990%)	^{239}Pu	5/2−
^{239}Am	95	144	239.0530227(21)	1949	11.9(1) h	α (0.010%)	^{235}Np	5/2−
^{239m}Am	2500(200) keV			1969	163(12) ns	SF	(various)	(7/2+)
^{240}Am	95	145	240.055298(15)	1949	50.8(3) h	β^{+}	^{240}Pu	(3−)
^{240}Am	95	145	240.055298(15)	1949	50.8(3) h	α (1.9×10^{−4}%)	^{236}Np	(3−)
^{240m}Am	3000(200) keV			1967	940(40) μs	SF	(various)	
^{241}Am	95	146	241.0568273(12)	1949	432.6(6) y	α	^{237}Np	5/2−
^{241}Am	95	146	241.0568273(12)	1949	432.6(6) y	SF (3.6×10^{−10}%)	(various)	5/2−
^{241m}Am	2200(200) keV			1969	1.2(3) μs	SF	(various)	
^{242}Am	95	147	242.0595474(12)	1949	16.02(2) h	β^{−} (82.7%)	^{242}Cm	1−
^{242}Am	95	147	242.0595474(12)	1949	16.02(2) h	EC (17.3%)	^{242}Pu	1−
^{242m1}Am	48.60(5) keV			1959	141(2) y	IT (99.55%)	^{242}Am	5−
^{242m1}Am	48.60(5) keV			1959	141(2) y	α (0.45%)	^{238}Np	5−
^{242m1}Am	48.60(5) keV			1959	141(2) y	SF (<4.7×10^{−9}%)	(various)	5−
^{242m2}Am	2200(80) keV			1962	14.0(10) ms	SF	(various)	(2+, 3−)
^{242m2}Am	2200(80) keV			1962	14.0(10) ms	IT	^{242}Am	(2+, 3−)
^{243}Am	95	148	243.0613799(15)	1950	7350(9) y	α	^{239}Np	5/2−
^{243}Am	95	148	243.0613799(15)	1950	7350(9) y	SF (3.7×10^{−9}%)	(various)	5/2−
^{243m}Am	2300(200) keV			1970	5.5(5) μs	SF	(various)	
^{244}Am	95	149	244.0642829(16)	1950	10.01(3) h	β^{−}	^{244}Cm	(6−)
^{244m1}Am	89.3(16) keV			1962	26.13(43) min	β^{−} (99.96%)	^{244}Cm	1+
^{244m1}Am	89.3(16) keV			1962	26.13(43) min	EC (0.0364%)	^{244}Pu	1+
^{244m2}Am	2000(200)# keV			1967	0.90(15) ms	SF	(various)	
^{244m3}Am	2200(200)# keV			(1967) (Note: The discovery of this isotope was only reported in a conference proceeding and not included in the discovery database.)	~6.5 μs	SF	(various)	
^{245}Am	95	150	245.0664528(20)	1955	2.05(1) h	β^{−}	^{245}Cm	5/2+
^{245m}Am	2400(400)# keV			1972	0.64(6) μs	SF	(various)	
^{246}Am	95	151	246.069774(19)#	1955	39(3) min	β^{−}	^{246}Cm	7−
^{246m1}Am	30(10)# keV			1967	25.0(2) min	β^{−}	^{246}Cm	2(−)
^{246m2}Am	2000(800)# keV			1972	73(10) μs	SF	(various)	
^{247}Am	95	152	247.07209(11)#	1967	23.0(13) min	β^{−}	^{247}Cm	5/2#
This table header & footer:

== Actinides vs fission products ==
Actinides and fission products by half-life
Actinides by decay chain				Half-life range (a)	Fission products of ^{235}U by yield
4n (Thorium)	4n + 1 (Neptunium)	4n + 2 (Radium)	4n + 3 (Actinium)	Half-life range (a)	4.5–7%	0.04–1.25%	<0.001%
^{228}Ra^{№}				4–6 a		^{155}Eu^{þ}
^{248}Bk				> 9 a
^{244}Cm^{ƒ}	^{241}Pu^{ƒ}	^{250}Cf	^{227}Ac^{№}	10–29 a	^{90}Sr	^{85}Kr	^{113m}Cd^{þ}
^{232}U^{ƒ}		^{238}Pu^{ƒ}	^{243}Cm^{ƒ}	29–97 a	^{137}Cs	^{151}Sm^{þ}	^{121m}Sn
	^{249}Cf^{ƒ}	^{242m}Am^{ƒ}		141–351 a	No fission products have a half-life in the range of 100 a–210 ka ...
	^{241}Am^{ƒ}		^{251}Cf^{ƒ}	430–900 a	No fission products have a half-life in the range of 100 a–210 ka ...
		^{226}Ra^{№}	^{247}Bk	1.3–1.6 ka	No fission products have a half-life in the range of 100 a–210 ka ...
^{240}Pu	^{229}Th	^{246}Cm^{ƒ}	^{243}Am^{ƒ}	4.7–7.4 ka	No fission products have a half-life in the range of 100 a–210 ka ...
	^{245}Cm^{ƒ}	^{250}Cm		8.3–8.5 ka	No fission products have a half-life in the range of 100 a–210 ka ...
			^{239}Pu^{ƒ}	24.1 ka	No fission products have a half-life in the range of 100 a–210 ka ...
		^{230}Th^{№}	^{231}Pa^{№}	32–76 ka	No fission products have a half-life in the range of 100 a–210 ka ...
^{236}Np^{ƒ}	^{233}U^{ƒ}	^{234}U^{№}		150–250 ka	^{99}Tc^{₡}	^{126}Sn
^{248}Cm		^{242}Pu		327–375 ka		^{79}Se^{₡}
				1.33 Ma	^{135}Cs^{₡}
	^{237}Np^{ƒ}			1.61–6.5 Ma	^{93}Zr	^{107}Pd
^{236}U			^{247}Cm^{ƒ}	15–24 Ma		^{129}I^{₡}
^{244}Pu				80 Ma	... nor beyond 15.7 Ma
^{232}Th^{№}		^{238}U^{№}	^{235}U^{ƒ№}	0.7–14.1 Ga	... nor beyond 15.7 Ma
₡, has thermal neutron capture cross section in the range of 8–50 barns; ƒ, fissile; №, primarily a naturally occurring radioactive material (NORM); þ, neutron poison (thermal neutron capture cross section greater than 3k barns)

== Americium-241 ==
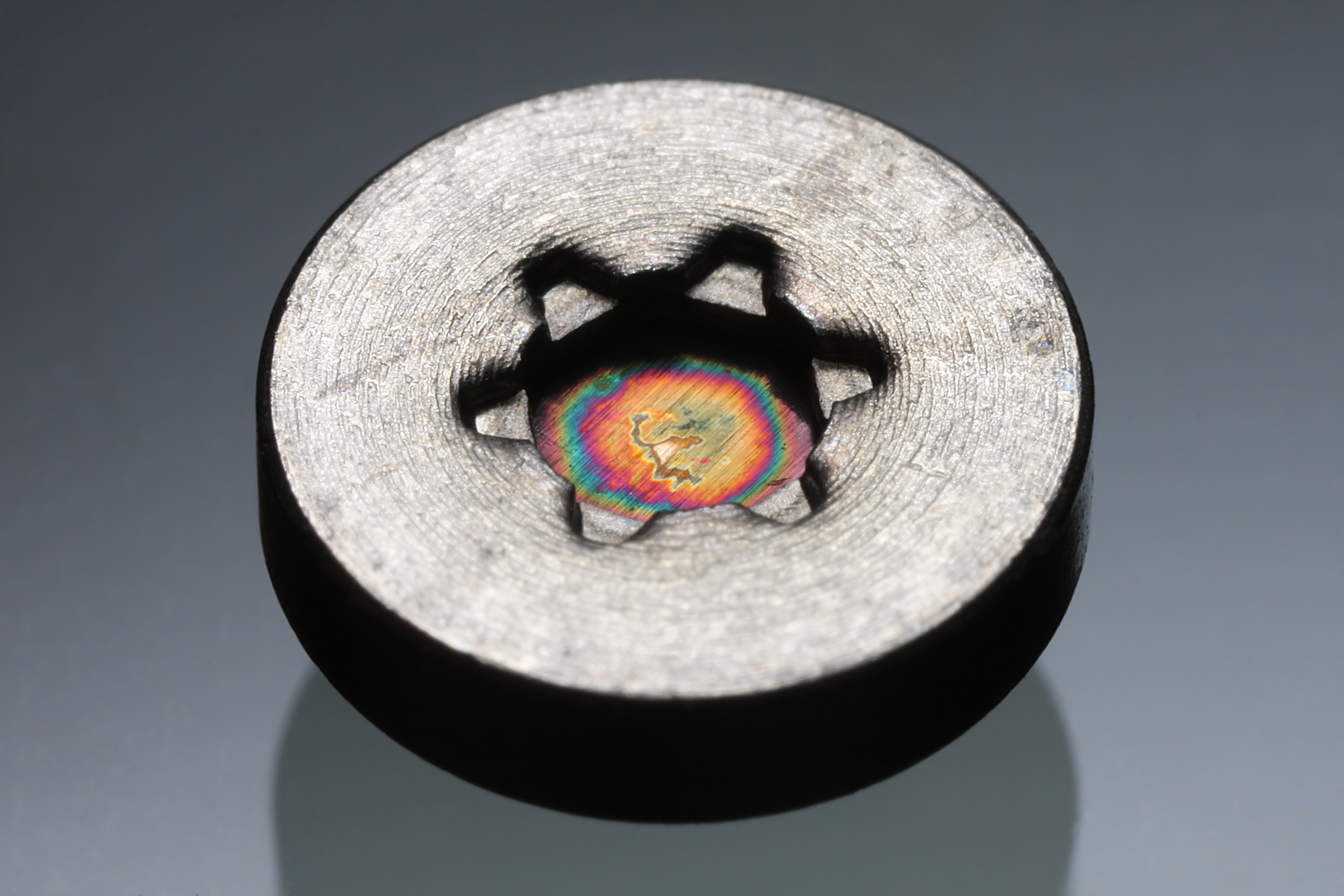
Americium-241, as used in ionization smoke detectors.

Americium-241 (alpha emitter, half-life 432.6 years) is the most common isotope of americium in nuclear waste. It is the isotope used in normal ionization smoke detectors, which work as an ionization chamber. It is a potential fuel for long-lifetime radioisotope thermoelectric generators, with a half-life longer than that of the standard plutonium-238 (87.7 years) or the alternative strontium-90 (28.91 years). Its decay heat is 0.114 W/g; its rate of spontaneous fission 1.2/g/s.

The alpha decay of ^{241}Am is accompanied by a significant emission of gamma rays. Its presence in plutonium is determined by the original concentration of ^{241}Pu (which decays to it) and the sample age. Older samples of plutonium containing plutonium-241 build up ^{241}Am, and chemical separation of americium from such plutonium (e.g. during reworking of plutonium pits) may be required.

== Americium-242m ==
Transmutation flow between ^{238}Pu and ^{244}Cm in LWR. Fission percentage is 100 minus shown percentages. Total rate of transmutation varies greatly by nuclide.^{245}Cm–^{248}Cm are long-lived with negligible decay.

Americium-242m (half-life 141 years) is one of the rare cases, like ^{108m}Ag, ^{166m}Ho, ^{180m}Ta, ^{186m}Re, ^{192m}Ir, ^{210m}Bi, ^{212m}Po and others, where a higher-energy nuclear isomer is more stable than its ground state. While that ground state, ^{242}Am, decays with half-life 16.02 hours by beta emission or electron capture, in a typical example of spin-forbiddenness the isomer does not decay by those modes, but falls to the ground state very slowly (99.55% of decays) or emits an alpha particle (0.45%, partial half-life 31 ky).

^{242m}Am is fissile with a low critical mass, comparable to that of ^{239}Pu. It has a very high fission cross section, and is quickly destroyed if it is produced in a nuclear reactor. It has been investigated whether this isotope could be used for a novel type of nuclear rocket.

== Americium-243 ==
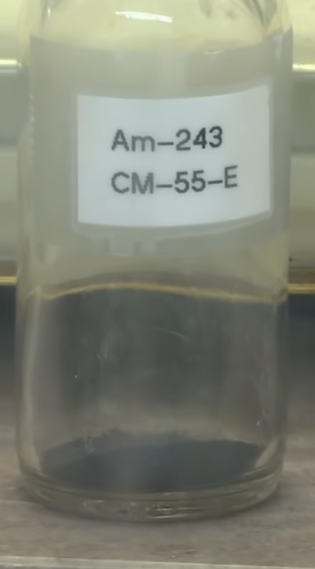
A sample of Am-243 oxide

Americium-243, an alpha emitter, has a half-life of 7350 years, the longest of all americium isotopes. It is formed in the nuclear fuel cycle mainly by neutron capture on plutonium-242 followed by beta decay. Production increases exponentially with increasing burnup as a total of 5 neutron captures on ^{238}U are required. If MOX-fuel is used, particularly MOX-fuel high in ^{241}Pu and ^{242}Pu, more americium overall and more ^{243}Am will be produced.

It decays by either emitting an alpha particle (decay energy 5.439 MeV) to become ^{239}Np, which then quickly goes to ^{239}Pu, or, very rarely, spontaneous fission. The fission rate is about 60% that of americium-241 or about 0.7/g/s.

As for the other americium isotopes, and more generally for all alpha emitters, ^{243}Am is carcinogenic in case of internal contamination after being inhaled or ingested. ^{243}Am also presents a risk of external irradiation associated with the gamma ray emitted by its short-lived decay product ^{239}Np. The external irradiation risk for the other two americium isotopes (^{241}Am and ^{242m}Am) is less than 10% of that for americium-243.

== Sources ==
- Isotope masses from:
  - National Nuclear Data Center. "NuDat 3.0 database". Brookhaven National Laboratory.
- Half-life, spin, and isomer data selected from the following sources.
  - National Nuclear Data Center. "NuDat 3.0 database". Brookhaven National Laboratory.
  - IAEA - Nuclear Data Section. Live Chart of Nuclides. Vienna International Centre.
  - Holden, Norman E. (2004). "11. Table of the Isotopes". In Lide, David R. (ed.). CRC Handbook of Chemistry and Physics (85th ed.). Boca Raton, Florida: CRC Press. ISBN 978-0-8493-0485-9.
