= Isotopes of radium =

Isotopes of radium (_{88}Ra)
Main isotopes			Decay	
Isotope	abundance	half-life (t_{1/2})	mode	product
^{223}Ra	trace	11.435 d	α	^{219}Rn
^{224}Ra	trace	3.632 d	α	^{220}Rn
^{225}Ra	trace	14.8 d	β^{−}	^{225}Ac
^{225}Ra	trace	14.8 d	α	^{221}Rn
^{226}Ra	trace	1600 y	α	^{222}Rn
^{228}Ra	trace	5.75 y	β^{−}	^{228}Ac

Radium (_{88}Ra) has no stable or nearly stable isotopes, and thus a standard atomic weight cannot be given. The longest lived, and most common, isotope of radium is ^{226}Ra with a half-life of 1600 years, which is in the decay chain of ^{238}U (the uranium or radium series).

Radium now has 34 known isotopes from ^{201}Ra to ^{234}Ra.

In the early history of the study of radioactivity, the different natural isotopes of radium were given different names (as were those of other radioactive elements), as it was not until Frederick Soddy's scientific work in the 1900s and 1910s that the concept of isotopes was employed. In this scheme, ^{223}Ra was named actinium X (AcX), ^{224}Ra thorium X (ThX), ^{226}Ra radium (Ra), and ^{228}Ra mesothorium 1 (MsTh_{1}). When it was realized that all of these are isotopes of the same element, many of these names fell out of use, and "radium" came to refer to all isotopes, not just ^{226}Ra, though mesothorium 1 in particular was still used for some time, with a footnote explaining that it referred to ^{228}Ra. The known decay products of radium-226 received historical names including "radium", starting with radium emanation and then ranging from radium A to radium G, with the letter indicating approximately how far they were down the chain from their parent. (Note: Radium emanation = ^{222}Rn, RaA = ^{218}Po, RaB = ^{214}Pb, RaC = ^{214}Bi, RaC' = ^{214}Po, RaC" = ^{210}Tl, RaD = ^{210}Pb, RaE = ^{210}Bi, RaF = ^{210}Po, and RaG = ^{206}Pb(stable, ending the chain).)

In 2013 it was discovered that the nucleus of radium-224 is pear-shaped. This was the first discovery of an asymmetrical nucleus.

== List of isotopes ==
Nuclide (Note: ^{m}Ra – Excited nuclear isomer.)	Historic name	Z	N	Isotopic mass (Da) (Note: ( ) – Uncertainty (1σ) is given in concise form in parentheses after the corresponding last digits.) (Note: # – Atomic mass marked #: value and uncertainty derived not from purely experimental data, but at least partly from trends from the Mass Surface (TMS).)	Discovery year	Half-life	Decay mode (Note: Modes of decay: EC: / Electron capture; CD: / Cluster decay; IT: / Isomeric transition)	Daughter isotope (Note: Bold symbol as daughter – Daughter product is stable.)	Spin and parity (Note: ( ) spin value – Indicates spin with weak assignment arguments.) (Note: # – Values marked # are not purely derived from experimental data, but at least partly from trends of neighboring nuclides (TNN).)	Isotopic abundance
Nuclide	Historic name	Excitation energy			Discovery year	Half-life	Decay mode	Daughter isotope	Spin and parity	Isotopic abundance
^{201}Ra		88	113	201.012815(22)	2005	20(30) ms	α	^{197}Rn	(3/2−)	
^{201m}Ra		263(26) keV			2014	6(5) ms	α	^{197}Rn	13/2+	
^{202}Ra		88	114	202.009742(16)	2005	4.1(11) ms	α	^{198}Rn	0+	
^{203}Ra		88	115	203.009234(10)	1996	36(13) ms	α	^{199}Rn	3/2−	
^{203m}Ra		246(14) keV			1996	25(5) ms	α	^{199}Rn	13/2+	
^{204}Ra		88	116	204.0065069(96)	1995	60(9) ms	α	^{200}Rn	0+	
^{205}Ra		88	117	205.006231(24)	1987	220(50) ms	α	^{201}Rn	3/2−	
^{205m}Ra		263(25) keV			1996	180(50) ms	α	^{201}Rn	13/2+	
^{206}Ra		88	118	206.003828(19)	1967	0.24(2) s	α	^{202}Rn	0+	
^{207}Ra		88	119	207.003772(63)	1967	1.38(18) s	α (86%)	^{203}Rn	5/2−#	
^{207}Ra		88	119	207.003772(63)	1967	1.38(18) s	β^{+} (14%)	^{207}Fr	5/2−#	
^{207m}Ra		560(60) keV			1987	57(8) ms	IT (85%#)	^{207}Ra	13/2+	
^{207m}Ra		560(60) keV			1987	57(8) ms	α (?%)	^{203m}Rn	13/2+	
^{207m}Ra		560(60) keV			1987	57(8) ms	β^{+} ?	^{207}Fr	13/2+	
^{208}Ra		88	120	208.0018550(97)	1967	1.110(45) s	α (87%)	^{204}Rn	0+	
^{208}Ra		88	120	208.0018550(97)	1967	1.110(45) s	β^{+} (13%)	^{208}Fr	0+	
^{208m}Ra		2147.4(4) keV			2005	263(17) ns	IT	^{208}Ra	(8+)	
^{209}Ra		88	121	209.0019949(62)	1967	4.71(8) s	α (90%)	^{205}Rn	5/2−	
^{209m}Ra		882.4(7) keV			2008	117(5) μs	α (90%)	^{205}Rn	13/2+	
^{209m}Ra		882.4(7) keV			2008	117(5) μs	β^{+} (10%)	^{209}Fr	13/2+	
^{210}Ra		88	122	210.0004754(99)	1967	4.0(1) s	α	^{206}Rn	0+	
^{210m}Ra		2050.9(7) keV			2004	2.29(3) μs	IT	^{210}Ra	8+	
^{211}Ra		88	123	211.0008930(53)	1967	12.6(12) s	α	^{207}Rn	5/2−	
^{211m}Ra		1198.1(8) keV			2004	9.5(3) μs	IT	^{211}Ra	13/2+	
^{212}Ra		88	124	211.999787(11)	1967	13.0(2) s	α	^{208}Rn	0+	
^{212}Ra		88	124	211.999787(11)	1967	13.0(2) s	β^{+} ?	^{212}Fr	0+	
^{212m1}Ra		1958.4(20) keV			1986	9.3(9) μs	IT	^{212}Ra	8+	
^{212m2}Ra		2613.3(20) keV			1986	0.85(13) μs	IT	^{212}Ra	11−	
^{213}Ra		88	125	213.000371(11)	1955	2.73(5) min	α (87%)	^{209}Rn	1/2−	
^{213}Ra		88	125	213.000371(11)	1955	2.73(5) min	β^{+} (13%)	^{213}Fr	1/2−	
^{213m}Ra		1768(4) keV			1976	2.20(5) ms	IT (99.4%)	^{213}Ra	(17/2−)	
^{213m}Ra		1768(4) keV			1976	2.20(5) ms	α (0.6%)	^{209}Rn	(17/2−)	
^{214}Ra		88	126	214.0000996(56)	1966	2.437(16) s	α (99.941%)	^{210}Rn	0+	
^{214}Ra		88	126	214.0000996(56)	1966	2.437(16) s	β^{+} (0.059%)	^{214}Fr	0+	
^{214m1}Ra		1819.7(18) keV			1992	118(7) ns	IT	^{214}Ra	6+	
^{214m2}Ra		1865.2(18) keV			1974	67.3(15) μs	IT (99.91%)	^{214}Ra	8+	
^{214m2}Ra		1865.2(18) keV			1974	67.3(15) μs	α (0.09%)	^{210}Rn	8+	
^{214m3}Ra		2683.2(18) keV			1979	295(7) ns	IT	^{214}Ra	11−	
^{214m4}Ra		3478.4(18) keV			1979	279(4) ns	IT	^{214}Ra	14+	
^{214m5}Ra		4146.8(18) keV			1979	225(4) ns	IT	^{214}Ra	17−	
^{214m6}Ra		6577.0(18) keV			1992	128(4) ns	IT	^{214}Ra	(25−)	
^{215}Ra		88	127	215.0027182(77)	1966	1.669(9) ms	α	^{211}Rn	9/2+#	
^{215m1}Ra		1877.8(3) keV			1988	7.31(13) μs	IT	^{215}Ra	(25/2+)	
^{215m2}Ra		2246.9(4) keV			1998	1.39(7) μs	IT	^{215}Ra	(29/2−)	
^{215m3}Ra		3807(50)# keV			1998	555(10) ns	IT	^{215}Ra	(43/2−)	
^{216}Ra		88	128	216.0035335(86)	1972	172(7) ns	α	^{212}Rn	0+	
^{216}Ra		88	128	216.0035335(86)	1972	172(7) ns	EC (<1×10^{−8}%)	^{216}Fr	0+	
^{217}Ra		88	129	217.0063227(76)	1970	1.95(12) μs	α	^{213}Rn	(9/2+)	
^{218}Ra		88	130	218.007134(11)	1970	25.91(14) μs	α	^{214}Rn	0+	
^{219}Ra		88	131	219.0100847(73)	1952	9(2) ms	α	^{215}Rn	(7/2)+	
^{219m}Ra		16.7(8) keV			2018	10(3) ms	α	^{215}Rn	(11/2)+	
^{220}Ra		88	132	220.0110275(82)	1949	18.1(12) ms	α	^{216}Rn	0+	
^{221}Ra		88	133	221.0139173(05)	1949	25(4) s	α	^{217}Rn	5/2+	Trace (Note: Intermediate decay product of ^{237}Np)
^{221}Ra		88	133	221.0139173(05)	1949	25(4) s	CD (1.2×10^{−10}%) (Note: Lightest known nuclide to undergo cluster decay)	^{207}Pb + ^{14}C	5/2+	Trace
^{222}Ra		88	134	222.0153734(48)	1948	33.6(4) s	α	^{218}Rn	0+	
^{222}Ra		88	134	222.0153734(48)	1948	33.6(4) s	CD (3.0×10^{−8}%)	^{208}Pb + ^{14}C	0+	
^{223}Ra (Note: Used for treating bone cancer)	Actinium X	88	135	223.0185006(22)	1905	11.4352(10) d	α	^{219}Rn	3/2+	Trace (Note: Intermediate decay product of ^{235}U)
^{223}Ra	Actinium X	88	135	223.0185006(22)	1905	11.4352(10) d	CD (8.9×10^{−8}%)	^{209}Pb + ^{14}C	3/2+	Trace
^{224}Ra	Thorium X	88	136	224.0202104(19)	1902	3.6316(14) d	α	^{220}Rn	0+	Trace (Note: Intermediate decay product of ^{232}Th)
^{224}Ra	Thorium X	88	136	224.0202104(19)	1902	3.6316(14) d	CD (4.0×10^{−9}%)	^{210}Pb + ^{14}C	0+	Trace
^{225}Ra		88	137	225.0236105(28)	1947	14.82(19) d	β^{−}	^{225}Ac	1/2+	Trace
^{225}Ra		88	137	225.0236105(28)	1947	14.82(19) d	α (0.0026%) (Note: The value .026%, found at other places, is a typographical error. The original data is cited here.)	^{221}Rn	1/2+	Trace
^{226}Ra	Radium (Note: Source of element's name)	88	138	226.0254082(21)	1898	1600(7) y	α (Note: Theoretically capable of β^{−}β^{−} decay to ^{226}Th)	^{222}Rn	0+	Trace (Note: Intermediate decay product of ^{238}U)
^{226}Ra	Radium	88	138	226.0254082(21)	1898	1600(7) y	CD (2.6×10^{−9}%)	^{212}Pb + ^{14}C	0+	Trace
^{227}Ra		88	139	227.0291762(21)	1953	42.2(5) min	β^{−}	^{227}Ac	3/2+	
^{228}Ra	Mesothorium 1	88	140	228.0310686(21)	1907	5.75(3) y	β^{−}	^{228}Ac	0+	Trace
^{229}Ra		88	141	229.034957(17)	1975	4.0(2) min	β^{−}	^{229}Ac	5/2+	
^{230}Ra		88	142	230.037055(11)	1978	93(2) min	β^{−}	^{230}Ac	0+	
^{231}Ra		88	143	231.041027(12)	1985	104(1) s	β^{−}	^{231}Ac	(5/2+)	
^{231m}Ra		66.21(9) keV			2001	~53 μs	IT	^{231}Ra	(1/2+)	
^{232}Ra		88	144	232.0434753(98)	1983	4.0(3) min	β^{−}	^{232}Ac	0+	
^{233}Ra		88	145	233.0475946(92)	1990	30(5) s	β^{−}	^{233}Ac	1/2+#	
^{234}Ra		88	146	234.0503821(90)	1990	30(10) s	β^{−}	^{234}Ac	0+	
This table header & footer:

== Actinides vs fission products ==
Actinides and fission products by half-life
Actinides by decay chain				Half-life range (a)	Fission products of ^{235}U by yield
4n (Thorium)	4n + 1 (Neptunium)	4n + 2 (Radium)	4n + 3 (Actinium)	Half-life range (a)	4.5–7%	0.04–1.25%	<0.001%
^{228}Ra^{№}				4–6 a		^{155}Eu^{þ}
^{248}Bk				> 9 a
^{244}Cm^{ƒ}	^{241}Pu^{ƒ}	^{250}Cf	^{227}Ac^{№}	10–29 a	^{90}Sr	^{85}Kr	^{113m}Cd^{þ}
^{232}U^{ƒ}		^{238}Pu^{ƒ}	^{243}Cm^{ƒ}	29–97 a	^{137}Cs	^{151}Sm^{þ}	^{121m}Sn
	^{249}Cf^{ƒ}	^{242m}Am^{ƒ}		141–351 a	No fission products have a half-life in the range of 100 a–210 ka ...
	^{241}Am^{ƒ}		^{251}Cf^{ƒ}	430–900 a	No fission products have a half-life in the range of 100 a–210 ka ...
		^{226}Ra^{№}	^{247}Bk	1.3–1.6 ka	No fission products have a half-life in the range of 100 a–210 ka ...
^{240}Pu	^{229}Th	^{246}Cm^{ƒ}	^{243}Am^{ƒ}	4.7–7.4 ka	No fission products have a half-life in the range of 100 a–210 ka ...
	^{245}Cm^{ƒ}	^{250}Cm		8.3–8.5 ka	No fission products have a half-life in the range of 100 a–210 ka ...
			^{239}Pu^{ƒ}	24.1 ka	No fission products have a half-life in the range of 100 a–210 ka ...
		^{230}Th^{№}	^{231}Pa^{№}	32–76 ka	No fission products have a half-life in the range of 100 a–210 ka ...
^{236}Np^{ƒ}	^{233}U^{ƒ}	^{234}U^{№}		150–250 ka	^{99}Tc^{₡}	^{126}Sn
^{248}Cm		^{242}Pu		327–375 ka		^{79}Se^{₡}
				1.33 Ma	^{135}Cs^{₡}
	^{237}Np^{ƒ}			1.61–6.5 Ma	^{93}Zr	^{107}Pd
^{236}U			^{247}Cm^{ƒ}	15–24 Ma		^{129}I^{₡}
^{244}Pu				80 Ma	... nor beyond 15.7 Ma
^{232}Th^{№}		^{238}U^{№}	^{235}U^{ƒ№}	0.7–14.1 Ga	... nor beyond 15.7 Ma
₡, has thermal neutron capture cross section in the range of 8–50 barns; ƒ, fissile; №, primarily a naturally occurring radioactive material (NORM); þ, neutron poison (thermal neutron capture cross section greater than 3k barns)
