= Isotopes of californium =

Isotopes of californium (_{98}Cf)
Main isotopes			Decay	
Isotope	abundance	half-life (t_{1/2})	mode	product
^{248}Cf	synth	333.5 d	α100%	^{244}Cm
^{248}Cf	synth	333.5 d	SF<0.01%	–
^{249}Cf	trace	351 y	α100%	^{245}Cm
^{249}Cf	trace	351 y	SF≪0.01%	–
^{250}Cf	synth	13.08 y	α99.9%	^{246}Cm
^{250}Cf	synth	13.08 y	SF0.08%	–
^{251}Cf	trace	898 y	α	^{247}Cm
^{252}Cf	trace	2.645 y	α96.9%	^{248}Cm
^{252}Cf	trace	2.645 y	SF3.1%	–
^{253}Cf	synth	17.81 d	β^{−}99.7%	^{253}Es
^{253}Cf	synth	17.81 d	α0.31%	^{249}Cm
^{254}Cf	synth	60.5 d	SF99.7%	–
^{254}Cf	synth	60.5 d	α0.31%	^{250}Cm

Californium (_{98}Cf) is an artificial element, and thus a standard atomic weight cannot be given. Like all artificial elements, it has no stable isotopes. The first isotope to be synthesized was ^{245}Cf in 1950. There are 20 known radioisotopes ranging from ^{237}Cf to ^{256}Cf and several short-lived nuclear isomers. The longest-lived isotope is ^{251}Cf with a half-life of 898 years; followed by ^{249}Cf (available isotopically pure from decay of berkelium) at 351 years.

== List of isotopes ==
Nuclide (Note: ^{m}Cf – Excited nuclear isomer.)	Z	N	Isotopic mass (Da) (Note: ( ) – Uncertainty (1σ) is given in concise form in parentheses after the corresponding last digits.) (Note: # – Atomic mass marked #: value and uncertainty derived not from purely experimental data, but at least partly from trends from the Mass Surface (TMS).)	Discovery year	Half-life	Decay mode (Note: Modes of decay: EC: / Electron capture; SF: / Spontaneous fission)	Daughter isotope	Spin and parity (Note: ( ) spin value – Indicates spin with weak assignment arguments.) (Note: # – Values marked # are not purely derived from experimental data, but at least partly from trends of neighboring nuclides (TNN).)
Nuclide	Excitation energy			Discovery year	Half-life	Decay mode	Daughter isotope	Spin and parity
^{237}Cf	98	139	237.06220(10)	1995	0.8(2) s	α (70%)	^{233}Cm	5/2+#
^{237}Cf	98	139	237.06220(10)	1995	0.8(2) s	SF (30%)	(various)	5/2+#
^{238}Cf	98	140	238.06149(32)#	1995	21.1(13) ms	SF (97.5%) (Note: Lightest nuclide known to undergo spontaneous fission as its main decay mode)	(various)	0+
^{238}Cf	98	140	238.06149(32)#	1995	21.1(13) ms	α (2.5%)	^{234}Cm	0+
^{239}Cf	98	141	239.06248(13)#	1981	28(2) s	α (65%)	^{235}Cm	5/2+#
^{239}Cf	98	141	239.06248(13)#	1981	28(2) s	β^{+}? (35%)	^{239}Bk	5/2+#
^{240}Cf	98	142	240.062253(19)	1970	40.3(9) s	α (98.5%)	^{236}Cm	0+
^{240}Cf	98	142	240.062253(19)	1970	40.3(9) s	SF (1.5%)	(various)	0+
^{241}Cf	98	143	241.06369(18)#	1970	2.35(18) min	β^{+}? (85%)	^{241}Bk	7/2−#
^{241}Cf	98	143	241.06369(18)#	1970	2.35(18) min	α (15%)	^{237}Cm	7/2−#
^{242}Cf	98	144	242.063755(14)	1967	3.49(15) min	α (61%)	^{238}Cm	0+
^{242}Cf	98	144	242.063755(14)	1967	3.49(15) min	β^{+} (39%)	^{242}Bk	0+
^{242}Cf	98	144	242.063755(14)	1967	3.49(15) min	SF (<0.014%)	(various)	0+
^{243}Cf	98	145	243.06548(19)#	1967	10.8(3) min	β^{+} (86%)	^{243}Bk	(1/2+)
^{243}Cf	98	145	243.06548(19)#	1967	10.8(3) min	α (14%)	^{239}Cm	(1/2+)
^{243m}Cf	~315 keV			2021	5.1 s	α (?%)	^{239}Cm	(7/2+)
^{244}Cf	98	146	244.0659994(28)	1956	19.5(5) min	α (75%)	^{240}Cm	0+
^{244}Cf	98	146	244.0659994(28)	1956	19.5(5) min	EC (25%)	^{244}Bk	0+
^{245}Cf	98	147	245.0680468(26)	1956	45.0(15) min	β^{+} (64.7%)	^{245}Bk	1/2+
^{245}Cf	98	147	245.0680468(26)	1956	45.0(15) min	α (35.3%)	^{241}Cm	1/2+
^{245m}Cf	57(4) keV			(2004) (Note: Half-life not measured, not included in discovery database)	>100# ns	IT	^{245}Cf	(7/2+)
^{246}Cf	98	148	246.0688037(16)	1951	35.7(5) h	α	^{242}Cm	0+
^{246}Cf	98	148	246.0688037(16)	1951	35.7(5) h	SF (2.4×10^{−4}%)	(various)	0+
^{247}Cf	98	149	247.070971(15)	1954	3.11(3) h	EC (99.965%)	^{247}Bk	(7/2+)
^{247}Cf	98	149	247.070971(15)	1954	3.11(3) h	α (0.035%)	^{243}Cm	(7/2+)
^{248}Cf	98	150	248.072183(5)	1954	333.5(28) d	α	^{244}Cm	0+
^{248}Cf	98	150	248.072183(5)	1954	333.5(28) d	SF (0.0029%)	(various)	0+
^{248m}Cf	900(300) keV			2022	~139 ns	IT?	^{248}Cf	
^{249}Cf	98	151	249.0748504(13)	1954	351(2) y	α	^{245}Cm	9/2−
^{249}Cf	98	151	249.0748504(13)	1954	351(2) y	SF (5×10^{−7}%)	(various)	9/2−
^{249m}Cf	144.98(5) keV			1967	45(5) μs	IT	^{249}Cf	5/2+
^{250}Cf	98	152	250.0764045(17)	1954	13.08(9) y	α (99.923%)	^{246}Cm	0+
^{250}Cf	98	152	250.0764045(17)	1954	13.08(9) y	SF (0.077%)	(various)	0+
^{251}Cf (Note: High neutron cross-section, tends to absorb neutrons)	98	153	251.079587(4)	1954	898(44) y	α	^{247}Cm	1/2+
^{251m}Cf	370.47(3) keV			1971	1.3(1) μs	IT	^{251}Cf	11/2−
^{252}Cf	98	154	252.0816265(25)	1954	2.645(8) y	α (96.8972%)	^{248}Cm	0+
^{252}Cf	98	154	252.0816265(25)	1954	2.645(8) y	SF (3.1028%) (Note: High neutron emitter, average 3.7 neutrons per fission)	(various)	0+
^{253}Cf	98	155	253.085134(5)	1954	17.81(8) d	β^{−} (99.69%)	^{253}Es	(7/2+)
^{253}Cf	98	155	253.085134(5)	1954	17.81(8) d	α (0.31%)	^{249}Cm	(7/2+)
^{254}Cf (Note: Theoretically capable of β^{−}β^{−} decay to ^{254}Fm)	98	156	254.087324(12)	1955	60.5(2) d	SF (99.69%)	(various)	0+
^{254}Cf	98	156	254.087324(12)	1955	60.5(2) d	α (0.31%)	^{250}Cm	0+
^{255}Cf	98	157	255.09105(22)#	1981	85(18) min	β^{−}	^{255}Es	(7/2+)
^{256}Cf (Note: Theoretically capable of β^{−}β^{−} decay to ^{256}Fm or perhaps β^{−} decay to ^{256}Es)	98	158	256.09344(34)#	1980	12.3(12) min	SF	(various)	0+
This table header & footer:

== Actinides vs fission products ==
Actinides and fission products by half-life
Actinides by decay chain				Half-life range (a)	Fission products of ^{235}U by yield
4n (Thorium)	4n + 1 (Neptunium)	4n + 2 (Radium)	4n + 3 (Actinium)	Half-life range (a)	4.5–7%	0.04–1.25%	<0.001%
^{228}Ra^{№}				4–6 a		^{155}Eu^{þ}
^{248}Bk				> 9 a
^{244}Cm^{ƒ}	^{241}Pu^{ƒ}	^{250}Cf	^{227}Ac^{№}	10–29 a	^{90}Sr	^{85}Kr	^{113m}Cd^{þ}
^{232}U^{ƒ}		^{238}Pu^{ƒ}	^{243}Cm^{ƒ}	29–97 a	^{137}Cs	^{151}Sm^{þ}	^{121m}Sn
	^{249}Cf^{ƒ}	^{242m}Am^{ƒ}		141–351 a	No fission products have a half-life in the range of 100 a–210 ka ...
	^{241}Am^{ƒ}		^{251}Cf^{ƒ}	430–900 a	No fission products have a half-life in the range of 100 a–210 ka ...
		^{226}Ra^{№}	^{247}Bk	1.3–1.6 ka	No fission products have a half-life in the range of 100 a–210 ka ...
^{240}Pu	^{229}Th	^{246}Cm^{ƒ}	^{243}Am^{ƒ}	4.7–7.4 ka	No fission products have a half-life in the range of 100 a–210 ka ...
	^{245}Cm^{ƒ}	^{250}Cm		8.3–8.5 ka	No fission products have a half-life in the range of 100 a–210 ka ...
			^{239}Pu^{ƒ}	24.1 ka	No fission products have a half-life in the range of 100 a–210 ka ...
		^{230}Th^{№}	^{231}Pa^{№}	32–76 ka	No fission products have a half-life in the range of 100 a–210 ka ...
^{236}Np^{ƒ}	^{233}U^{ƒ}	^{234}U^{№}		150–250 ka	^{99}Tc^{₡}	^{126}Sn
^{248}Cm		^{242}Pu		327–375 ka		^{79}Se^{₡}
				1.33 Ma	^{135}Cs^{₡}
	^{237}Np^{ƒ}			1.61–6.5 Ma	^{93}Zr	^{107}Pd
^{236}U			^{247}Cm^{ƒ}	15–24 Ma		^{129}I^{₡}
^{244}Pu				80 Ma	... nor beyond 15.7 Ma
^{232}Th^{№}		^{238}U^{№}	^{235}U^{ƒ№}	0.7–14.1 Ga	... nor beyond 15.7 Ma
₡, has thermal neutron capture cross section in the range of 8–50 barns; ƒ, fissile; №, primarily a naturally occurring radioactive material (NORM); þ, neutron poison (thermal neutron capture cross section greater than 3k barns)

== Californium-252 ==
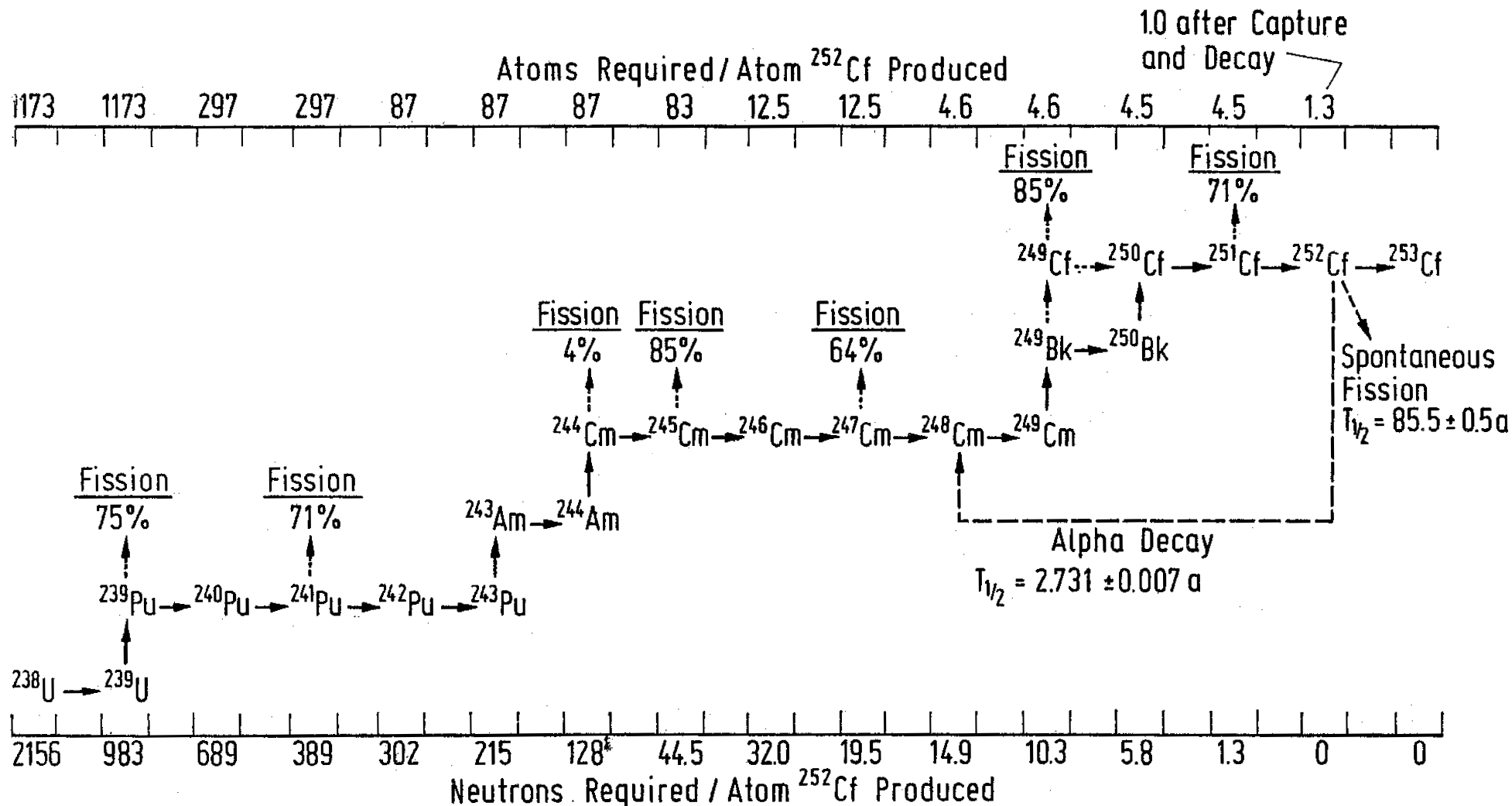
Californium-252 production diagram

Californium-252 (Cf-252, ^{252}Cf) undergoes spontaneous fission with a branching ratio of 3.09% and is used in small neutron sources. Fission neutrons have an energy range of 0 to 13 MeV with a mean value of 2.3 MeV and a most probable value of 1 MeV.

This isotope produces high neutron emissions and has a number of uses in industries such as nuclear energy, medicine, and petrochemical exploration.

=== Nuclear reactors ===
Californium-252 neutron sources are most notably used in the start-up of nuclear reactors. Once a reactor is filled with nuclear fuel, the stable neutron emission from said source starts the chain reaction.

=== Military and defense ===
The portable isotopic neutron spectroscopy (PINS) used by United States Armed Forces, the National Guard, Homeland Security, and Customs and Border Protection, uses ^{252}Cf sources to detect hazardous contents inside artillery projectiles, mortar projectiles, rockets, bombs, land mines, and improvised explosive devices (IED).

=== Oil and petroleum ===
In the oil industry, ^{252}Cf is used to find layers of petroleum and water in a well. Instrumentation is lowered into the well, which bombards the formation with high energy neutrons to determine porosity, permeability, and hydrocarbon presence along the length of the borehole.

=== Medicine ===
Californium-252 has also been used in the treatment of serious forms of cancer. For certain types of brain and cervical cancer, ^{252}Cf can be used as a more cost-effective substitute for radium in brachytherapy.

== Sources ==
- Lide, David R., ed. (2006). Handbook of Chemistry and Physics (87th ed.). CRC Press, Taylor & Francis Group. ISBN 978-0-8493-0487-3.
