= Isotopes of thorium =

Isotopes of thorium (_{90}Th)
Main isotopes			Decay	
Isotope	abundance	half-life (t_{1/2})	mode	product
^{227}Th	trace	18.693 d	α	^{223}Ra
^{228}Th	trace	1.9125 y	α	^{224}Ra
^{229}Th	trace	7916 y	α	^{225}Ra
^{230}Th	0.02%	75400 y	α	^{226}Ra
^{231}Th	trace	25.52 h	β^{−}	^{231}Pa
^{232}Th	99.98%	1.40×10^{10} y	α	^{228}Ra
^{233}Th	trace	21.83 min	β^{−}	^{233}Pa
^{234}Th	trace	24.11 d	β^{−}	^{234}Pa

Standard atomic weight A_{r}°(Th)
- 232.0377±0.0004; 232.04±0.01 (abridged)

Thorium (_{90}Th) has seven naturally occurring isotopes but none are stable. One isotope, ^{232}Th, is relatively stable, with a half-life of 1.40×10^{10} years, considerably longer than the age of the Earth, and even slightly longer than the generally accepted age of the universe. This isotope makes up nearly all natural thorium, so thorium was considered to be mononuclidic. However, in 2013, IUPAC reclassified thorium as binuclidic, due to large amounts of ^{230}Th in deep seawater. Thorium has a characteristic terrestrial isotopic composition and thus a standard atomic weight can be given.

Thirty-one radioisotopes have been characterized, with the most stable being ^{232}Th, ^{230}Th with a half-life of 75,400 years, ^{229}Th with a half-life of 7,916 years, and ^{228}Th with a half-life of 1.91 years. All of the remaining radioactive isotopes have half-lives that are less than thirty days and the majority of these have half-lives that are less than ten minutes. One isotope, ^{229}Th, has a nuclear isomer (or metastable state) with a remarkably low excitation energy, recently measured to be 8.355733554021(8) eV It has been proposed to perform laser spectroscopy of the ^{229}Th nucleus and use the low-energy transition for the development of a nuclear clock of extremely high accuracy.

The known isotopes of thorium range in mass number from 207 to 238.

== List of isotopes ==
Nuclide (Note: ^{m}Th – Excited nuclear isomer.)	Historic name	Z	N	Isotopic mass (Da) (Note: ( ) – Uncertainty (1σ) is given in concise form in parentheses after the corresponding last digits.) (Note: # – Atomic mass marked #: value and uncertainty derived not from purely experimental data, but at least partly from trends from the Mass Surface (TMS).)	Discovery year	Half-life (Note: Bold half-life – nearly stable, half-life longer than age of universe.)	Decay mode (Note: Modes of decay: EC: / Electron capture; CD: / Cluster decay; IT: / Isomeric transition)	Daughter isotope (Note: Bold symbol as daughter – Daughter product is stable.)	Spin and parity (Note: ( ) spin value – Indicates spin with weak assignment arguments.) (Note: # – Values marked # are not purely derived from experimental data, but at least partly from trends of neighboring nuclides (TNN).)	Natural abundance (mole fraction)	
Nuclide	Historic name	Excitation energy			Discovery year	Half-life	Decay mode	Daughter isotope	Spin and parity	Normal proportion	Range of variation
^{207}Th		90	117		2022	9.7+46.6 −4.4 ms	α	^{203}Ra			
^{208}Th		90	118	208.017915(34)	2010	2.4(12) ms	α	^{204}Ra	0+		
^{209}Th		90	119	209.017998(27)	1996	3.1(12) ms	α	^{205}Ra	13/2+		
^{210}Th		90	120	210.015094(20)	1995	16.0(36) ms	α	^{206}Ra	0+		
^{211}Th		90	121	211.014897(92)	1995	48(20) ms	α	^{207}Ra	5/2−#		
^{211m}Th		778(8) keV			2021	83(8) μs	IT	^{211}Th	13/2+		
^{212}Th		90	122	212.013002(11)	1980	31.7(13) ms	α	^{208}Ra	0+		
^{213}Th		90	123	213.0130115(99)	1968	144(21) ms	α	^{209}Ra	5/2−		
^{213m}Th		1180.0(14) keV			2007	1.4(4) μs	IT	^{213}Th	(13/2)+		
^{214}Th		90	124	214.011481(11)	1968	87(10) ms	α	^{210}Ra	0+		
^{214m}Th		2181.0(27) keV			2007	1.24(12) μs	IT	^{214}Th	8+#		
^{215}Th		90	125	215.0117246(68)	1968	1.35(14) s	α	^{211}Ra	(1/2−)		
^{215m}Th		1471(50)# keV			2005	770(60) ns	IT	^{215}Th	9/2+#		
^{216}Th		90	126	216.011056(12)	1968	26.28(16) ms	α	^{212}Ra	0+		
^{216m1}Th		2041(8) keV			1983	135.4(29) μs	IT (97.2%)	^{216}Th	8+		
^{216m1}Th		2041(8) keV			1983	135.4(29) μs	α (2.8%)	^{212}Ra	8+		
^{216m2}Th		2648(8) keV			2001	580(26) ns	IT	^{216}Th	(11−)		
^{216m3}Th		3682(8) keV			2001	740(70) ns	IT	^{216}Th	(14+)		
^{217}Th		90	127	217.013103(11)	1968	248(4) μs	α	^{213}Ra	9/2+#		
^{217m1}Th		673.3(1) keV			1989	141(50) ns	IT	^{217}Th	(15/2−)		
^{217m2}Th		2307(32) keV			2005	71(14) μs	IT	^{217}Th	(25/2+)		
^{218}Th		90	128	218.013276(11)	1973	122(5) ns	α	^{214}Ra	0+		
^{219}Th		90	129	219.015526(61)	1973	1.023(18) μs	α	^{215}Ra	9/2+#		
^{220}Th		90	130	220.015770(15)	1973	10.2(3) μs	α	^{216}Ra	0+		
^{221}Th		90	131	221.0181858(86)	1970	1.75(2) ms	α	^{217}Ra	7/2+#		
^{222}Th		90	132	222.018468(11)	1970	2.24(3) ms	α	^{218}Ra	0+		
^{223}Th		90	133	223.0208111(85)	1952	0.60(2) s	α	^{219}Ra	(5/2)+		
^{224}Th		90	134	224.021466(10)	1949	1.04(2) s	α (Note: Theorized to also undergo β^{+}β^{+} decay to ^{224}Ra)	^{220}Ra	0+		
^{225}Th		90	135	225.0239510(55)	1949	8.75(4) min	α (~90%)	^{221}Ra	3/2+		
^{225}Th		90	135	225.0239510(55)	1949	8.75(4) min	EC (~10%)	^{225}Ac	3/2+		
^{226}Th		90	136	226.0249037(48)	1948	30.70(3) min	α	^{222}Ra	0+		
^{226}Th		90	136	226.0249037(48)	1948	30.70(3) min	CD (<3.2×10^{−12}%)	^{208}Pb + ^{18}O	0+		
^{227}Th	Radioactinium	90	137	227.0277025(22)	1906	18.693(4) d	α	^{223}Ra	(1/2+)	Trace (Note: Intermediate decay product of ^{235}U)	
^{228}Th	Radiothorium	90	138	228.0287397(19)	1905	1.9125(7) y	α	^{224}Ra	0+	Trace (Note: Intermediate decay product of ^{232}Th)	
^{228}Th	Radiothorium	90	138	228.0287397(19)	1905	1.9125(7) y	CD (1.13×10^{−11}%)	^{208}Pb + ^{20}O	0+	Trace	
^{229}Th		90	139	229.0317614(26)	1947	7916(17) y	α	^{225}Ra	5/2+	Trace (Note: Intermediate decay product of ^{237}Np)	
^{229m}Th		8.355733554021(8) eV			1990	7(1) μs	IT (Note: Neutral ^{229m}Th decays rapidly by internal conversion, ejecting an electron. There is not enough energy to eject a second electron, so ^{229m}Th^{+} ions live much longer, decaying by gamma emission. See § Thorium-229m.)	^{229}Th^{+}	3/2+		
^{229m}Th^{+}		8.355733554021(8) eV			(1990) (Note: Same isomeric state as above)	29(1) min	γ	^{229}Th^{+}	3/2+		
^{230}Th (Note: Used in uranium–thorium dating)	Ionium	90	140	230.0331323(13)	1907	7.54(3)×10^{4} y	α	^{226}Ra	0+	0.0002(2) (Note: Intermediate decay product of ^{238}U)	
^{230}Th	Ionium	90	140	230.0331323(13)	1907	7.54(3)×10^{4} y	CD (5.8×10^{−11}%)	^{206}Hg + ^{24}Ne	0+	0.0002(2)	
^{230}Th	Ionium	90	140	230.0331323(13)	1907	7.54(3)×10^{4} y	SF (<4×10^{−12}%)	(various)	0+	0.0002(2)	
^{231}Th	Uranium Y	90	141	231.0363028(13)	1911	25.52(1) h	β^{−}	^{231}Pa	5/2+	Trace	
^{232}Th (Note: Primordial radionuclide)	Thorium	90	142	232.0380536(15)	1898	1.40(1)×10^{10} y	α (Note: Theorized to also undergo β^{−}β^{−} decay to ^{232}U)	^{228}Ra	0+	0.9998(2)	
^{232}Th	Thorium	90	142	232.0380536(15)	1898	1.40(1)×10^{10} y	SF (1.1 × 10^{−9}%)	(various)	0+	0.9998(2)	
^{232}Th	Thorium	90	142	232.0380536(15)	1898	1.40(1)×10^{10} y	CD (<2.78×10^{−10}%)	^{208}Hg + ^{24}Ne^{206}Hg + ^{26}Ne	0+	0.9998(2)	
^{233}Th		90	143	233.0415801(15)	1935	21.83(4) min	β^{−}	^{233}Pa	1/2+	Trace (Note: Produced in neutron capture by ^{232}Th)	
^{234}Th	Uranium X_{1}	90	144	234.0435998(28)	1900	24.107(24) d	β^{−}	^{234m}Pa	0+	Trace	
^{235}Th		90	145	235.047255(14)	1969	7.2(1) min	β^{−}	^{235}Pa	1/2+#		
^{236}Th		90	146	236.049657(15)	1973	37.3(15) min	β^{−}	^{236}Pa	0+		
^{237}Th		90	147	237.053629(17)	1993	4.8(5) min	β^{−}	^{237}Pa	5/2+#		
^{238}Th		90	148	238.05639(30)#	1999	9.4(20) min	β^{−}	^{238}Pa	0+		
This table header & footer:

== Uses ==
Thorium has been suggested for use in thorium-based nuclear power.

In many countries the use of thorium in consumer products is banned or discouraged because it is radioactive.

It is currently used in cathodes of vacuum tubes, for a combination of physical stability at high temperature and a low work energy required to remove an electron from its surface.

It has, for about a century, been used in mantles of gas and vapor lamps such as gas lights and camping lanterns.

=== Low dispersion lenses ===
Thorium was also used in certain glass elements of Aero-Ektar lenses made by Kodak during World War II. Thus they are mildly radioactive. Two of the glass elements in the f/2.5 Aero-Ektar lenses are 11% and 13% thorium by weight. The thorium-containing glasses were used because they have a high refractive index with a low dispersion (variation of index with wavelength), a highly desirable property. Many surviving Aero-Ektar lenses have a tea colored tint, possibly due to radiation damage to the glass.

These lenses were used for aerial reconnaissance because the radiation level is not high enough to fog film over a short period. This would indicate the radiation level is reasonably safe. However, when not in use, it would be prudent to store these lenses as far as possible from normally inhabited areas; allowing the inverse square relationship to attenuate the radiation.

== Actinides vs. fission products ==
Actinides and fission products by half-life
Actinides by decay chain				Half-life range (a)	Fission products of ^{235}U by yield
4n (Thorium)	4n + 1 (Neptunium)	4n + 2 (Radium)	4n + 3 (Actinium)	Half-life range (a)	4.5–7%	0.04–1.25%	<0.001%
^{228}Ra^{№}				4–6 a		^{155}Eu^{þ}
^{248}Bk				> 9 a
^{244}Cm^{ƒ}	^{241}Pu^{ƒ}	^{250}Cf	^{227}Ac^{№}	10–29 a	^{90}Sr	^{85}Kr	^{113m}Cd^{þ}
^{232}U^{ƒ}		^{238}Pu^{ƒ}	^{243}Cm^{ƒ}	29–97 a	^{137}Cs	^{151}Sm^{þ}	^{121m}Sn
	^{249}Cf^{ƒ}	^{242m}Am^{ƒ}		141–351 a	No fission products have a half-life in the range of 100 a–210 ka ...
	^{241}Am^{ƒ}		^{251}Cf^{ƒ}	430–900 a	No fission products have a half-life in the range of 100 a–210 ka ...
		^{226}Ra^{№}	^{247}Bk	1.3–1.6 ka	No fission products have a half-life in the range of 100 a–210 ka ...
^{240}Pu	^{229}Th	^{246}Cm^{ƒ}	^{243}Am^{ƒ}	4.7–7.4 ka	No fission products have a half-life in the range of 100 a–210 ka ...
	^{245}Cm^{ƒ}	^{250}Cm		8.3–8.5 ka	No fission products have a half-life in the range of 100 a–210 ka ...
			^{239}Pu^{ƒ}	24.1 ka	No fission products have a half-life in the range of 100 a–210 ka ...
		^{230}Th^{№}	^{231}Pa^{№}	32–76 ka	No fission products have a half-life in the range of 100 a–210 ka ...
^{236}Np^{ƒ}	^{233}U^{ƒ}	^{234}U^{№}		150–250 ka	^{99}Tc^{₡}	^{126}Sn
^{248}Cm		^{242}Pu		327–375 ka		^{79}Se^{₡}
				1.33 Ma	^{135}Cs^{₡}
	^{237}Np^{ƒ}			1.61–6.5 Ma	^{93}Zr	^{107}Pd
^{236}U			^{247}Cm^{ƒ}	15–24 Ma		^{129}I^{₡}
^{244}Pu				80 Ma	... nor beyond 15.7 Ma
^{232}Th^{№}		^{238}U^{№}	^{235}U^{ƒ№}	0.7–14.1 Ga	... nor beyond 15.7 Ma
₡, has thermal neutron capture cross section in the range of 8–50 barns; ƒ, fissile; №, primarily a naturally occurring radioactive material (NORM); þ, neutron poison (thermal neutron capture cross section greater than 3k barns)

== Notable isotopes ==
=== Thorium-228 ===
^{228}Th is an isotope of thorium with 138 neutrons. It was once named Radiothorium, due to its occurrence in the disintegration chain of thorium-232. It has a half-life of 1.9125 years. It undergoes alpha decay to ^{224}Ra. Occasionally it decays by the unusual route of cluster decay, emitting a nucleus of ^{20}O and producing stable ^{208}Pb. It is a daughter isotope of ^{232}U and responsible for its radiological hazard.

Together with its decay product ^{224}Ra it is used for alpha particle radiation therapy.

=== Thorium-229 ===
^{229}Th is a radioactive isotope of thorium that decays by alpha emission with a half-life of 7916 years. ^{229}Th is produced by the decay of uranium-233, and its principal use is for the production of the medical isotopes actinium-225 and bismuth-213.

==== Thorium-229m ====
^{229}Th has a nuclear isomer, ^{229m}Th, with an excitation energy of 8.355733554021(8) eV. This is by far the lowest of all nuclear isomers.

Because this energy lies between thorium's first and second ionization energies of 6.3 and 11.5 eV, the decay rate of ^{229m}Th is sensitive to the electronic environment of the nucleus. In neutral ^{229m}Th, the isomer decays by internal conversion to ^{229}Th^{+} within a few microseconds. However, the isomeric energy is not enough to remove a second electron, so internal conversion is impossible in ^{229m}Th^{+} ions; they are forced to decay radiatively with a half-life 8.4 orders of magnitude longer, in excess of 1000 seconds. Embedded in ionic crystals, ionization is not quite 100%, so a small amount of internal conversion occurs, leading to a recently measured lifetime of ≈600 s, which can be extrapolated to a lifetime for isolated ions of 1740±50 s.

Any photon emitted by nuclear decay is called a gamma ray, but this "gamma ray" has a frequency of 2020407384335±2 kHz (wavelength 148.3821828827(15) nm), in the far ultraviolet. This means it is possible to build a laser operating at this frequency, giving the only known opportunity for direct laser excitation of a nuclear state. This could have applications like a nuclear clock of very high accuracy or as a qubit for quantum computing.

These applications were for a long time impeded by imprecise measurements of the isomeric energy, as laser excitation's exquisite precision makes it difficult to use to search a wide frequency range. There were many investigations, both theoretical and experimental, trying to determine the transition energy precisely and to specify other properties of the isomeric state of ^{229}Th (such as its lifetime and magnetic moment), until the frequency was accurately measured in 2024.

The first prototype nuclear clocks were announced in June 2026.

==== History ====
Early measurements of thorium isomers were performed via gamma ray spectroscopy, producing the 29.5855 keV excited state of ^{229}Th, and measuring the difference in emitted gamma ray energies as it decays to either the ^{229m}Th (90%) or ^{229}Th (10%) isomeric states. In 1976, Kroger and Reich sought to understand coriolis force effects in deformed nuclei, and attempted to match thorium's gamma-ray spectrum to theoretical nuclear shape models. To their surprise, the known nuclear states could not be reasonably classified into different total angular momentum quantization levels. They concluded that some states previously identified as ^{229}Th actually arose from a spin-3/2 nuclear isomer, ^{229m}Th, with a remarkably low excitation energy.

At that time the energy was inferred to be below 100 eV, purely based on the non-observation of the isomer's direct decay. However, in 1990, further measurements led to the conclusion that the energy is almost certainly below 10 eV, making it one of the lowest known isomeric excitation energies. In the following years, the energy was further constrained to 3.5±1.0 eV, which was for a long time the accepted energy value.

Improved gamma ray spectroscopy measurements using an advanced high-resolution X-ray microcalorimeter were carried out in 2007, yielding a new value for the transition energy of 7.6±0.5 eV, corrected to 7.8±0.5 eV in 2009. Earlier attempts to observe emitted photons had been doomed by a failure to consider two consequences of this higher energy:

- because it is above thorium's 6.3 eV first ionization energy, neutral ^{229m}Th can decay by internal conversion, and will almost always do so, rather than emitting a photon, and
- because it is above the 6.2 eV vacuum ultraviolet cutoff, the produced photons cannot travel through air.

But even when experiments were redesigned to detect the higher energy, most of the searches in the 2010s for light emitted by the isomeric decay failed to observe any signal, pointing towards a potentially strong non-radiative decay channel. A direct detection of photons emitted in the isomeric decay was claimed in 2012 and again in 2018. However, both reports were controversial within the community.

A direct detection of electrons being emitted in the internal conversion decay channel of ^{229m}Th was achieved in 2016. However, at the time the isomer's transition energy could only be weakly constrained to between 6.3 and 18.3 eV. Finally, in 2019, non-optical electron spectroscopy of the internal conversion electrons emitted in the isomeric decay allowed for a determination of the isomer's excitation energy to 8.28±0.17 eV. However, this value appeared at odds with the 2018 preprint showing that a similar signal as an 8.4 eV xenon VUV photon can be shown, but with about 1.3+0.2
−0.1 eV less energy and a (retrospectively correct) 1880±170 s lifetime. In that paper, ^{229}Th was embedded in SiO_{2}, possibly resulting in an energy shift and altered lifetime, although the states involved are primarily nuclear, shielding them from electronic interactions.

In another 2018 experiment, it was possible to perform a first laser-spectroscopic characterization of the nuclear properties of ^{229m}Th. In this experiment, laser spectroscopy of the ^{229}Th atomic shell was conducted using a ^{229}Th^{2+} ion cloud with 2% of the ions in the nuclear excited state. This allowed probing for the hyperfine shift induced by the different nuclear spin states of the ground and the isomeric state. In this way, a first experimental value for the magnetic dipole and the electric quadrupole moment of ^{229m}Th could be inferred.

In 2019, the isomer's excitation energy was constrained to 8.28±0.17 eV based on the direct detection of internal conversion electrons and a secure population of ^{229m}Th from the nuclear ground state was achieved by excitation of the 29 keV nuclear excited state via synchrotron radiation. Additional measurements by a different group in 2020 produced a figure of 8.10±0.17 eV (153.1±3.2 nm wavelength). Combining these measurements, the expected transition energy is 8.12±0.11 eV.

In September 2022, spectroscopy on decaying samples determined the excitation energy to be 8.338±0.024 eV.

In April 2024, two separate groups finally reported precision laser excitation Th^{4+} cations doped into ionic crystals (of CaF_{2} and LiSrAlF_{6} with additional interstitial F^{−} anions for charge compensation), giving a precise (~1 part per million) measurement of the transition energy. A one-part-per-trillion (10^{−12}) measurement soon followed in June 2024, and future high-precision lasers will measure the frequency up to the 10^{−18} accuracy of the best atomic clocks.

=== Thorium-230 ===
^{230}Th is a radioactive isotope of thorium that can be used to date corals (uranium-thorium dating) and determine ocean current flux. Ionium (symbol Io) was the name given early in the study of radioactive elements to the ^{230}Th isotope produced in the decay chain of ^{238}U before the nature of isotopes was fully realized. The name is still used in ionium–thorium dating, another dating method using this isotope.

=== Thorium-231 ===
^{231}Th has 141 neutrons. It is the decay product of uranium-235. It is found in very small amounts on the earth and has a half-life of 25.52 hours. When it decays, it emits a beta ray and forms protactinium-231, with a decay energy of 0.39 MeV.

=== Thorium-232 ===
^{232}Th is the only primordial nuclide of thorium and makes up effectively all of natural thorium, with other isotopes of thorium appearing only in trace amounts as relatively short-lived decay products of uranium and thorium. The isotope decays by alpha decay with a half-life of 1.40×10^{10} years, over three times the age of the Earth and approximately the age of the universe. Its decay chain is the thorium series, eventually ending in lead-208. The remainder of the chain is quick; the longest half-lives in it are 5.75 years for radium-228 and 1.91 years for thorium-228, with all other half-lives totaling less than a week.

^{232}Th is a fertile material able to absorb a neutron and undergo transmutation into the fissile nuclide uranium-233, which is the basis of the thorium fuel cycle. In the form of Thorotrast, a thorium dioxide suspension, it was used as a contrast medium in early X-ray diagnostics. Thorium-232 is now classified as carcinogenic.

=== Thorium-233 ===
^{233}Th is an isotope of thorium that decays into protactinium-233 through beta decay, then into uranium-233 to join the neptunium series decay chain. It has a half-life of 21.83 minutes. Traces occur in nature as the result of natural neutron activation of ^{232}Th.

=== Thorium-234 ===
^{234}Th is an isotope of thorium whose nuclei contain 144 neutrons. ^{234}Th has a half-life of 24.11 days; it emits a beta particle, transmuting into protactinium-234 with a decay energy around 0.27 MeV. Uranium-238 almost always produces isotope of thorium on decay (although in rare cases it undergoes spontaneous fission, and even more rarely double beta decay).
