= Isotopes of neptunium =

Isotopes of neptunium (_{93}Np)
Main isotopes			Decay	
Isotope	abundance	half-life (t_{1/2})	mode	product
^{235}Np	synth	396.1 d	ε	^{235}U
^{235}Np	synth	396.1 d	α	^{231}Pa
^{236}Np	synth	1.53×10^{5} y	ε	^{236}U
^{236}Np	synth	1.53×10^{5} y	β^{−}	^{236}Pu
^{236}Np	synth	1.53×10^{5} y	α	^{232}Pa
^{237}Np	trace	2.144×10^{6} y	α	^{233}Pa
^{238}Np	synth	2.099 d	β^{−}	^{238}Pu
^{239}Np	trace	2.356 d	β^{−}	^{239}Pu

Neptunium (_{93}Np) is usually considered an artificial element, although trace quantities are found in nature, so a standard atomic weight cannot be given. Like all trace or artificial elements, it has no stable isotopes. The first isotope to be synthesized and identified was ^{239}Np in 1940, produced by bombarding ^{238}U with neutrons to produce ^{239}U, which then underwent beta decay to ^{239}Np.

Trace quantities are found in nature from neutron capture reactions by uranium atoms, a fact not discovered until 1951.

Twenty-five neptunium radioisotopes have been characterized, with the most stable being ^{237}Np with a half-life of 2.144 million years, ^{236}Np with a half-life of 153,000 years, and ^{235}Np with a half-life of 396.1 days. All of the remaining radioactive isotopes have half-lives that are less than 4.5 days, and the majority of these have half-lives that are less than 50 minutes. This element also has five meta states, with the most stable being ^{236m}Np (t_{1/2} 22.5 hours).

The isotopes of neptunium range from ^{219}Np to ^{244}Np, though the intermediate isotope ^{221}Np has not yet been observed. The primary decay mode for nuclei lighter than the most stable isotope, ^{237}Np, is electron capture (and also alpha emission), and the primary mode after is beta emission. The primary decay products for nuclei lighter than ^{237}Np are isotopes of uranium and protactinium, and the primary products after are isotopes of plutonium. Neptunium is the heaviest element for which the location of the proton drip line is known; the lightest proton-bound isotope is ^{220}Np.

== List of isotopes ==
Nuclide (Note: ^{m}Np – Excited nuclear isomer.)	Z	N	Isotopic mass (Da) (Note: ( ) – Uncertainty (1σ) is given in concise form in parentheses after the corresponding last digits.) (Note: # – Atomic mass marked #: value and uncertainty derived not from purely experimental data, but at least partly from trends from the Mass Surface (TMS).)	Discovery year	Half-life	Decay mode (Note: Modes of decay: EC: / Electron capture; CD: / Cluster decay; IT: / Isomeric transition; SF: / Spontaneous fission)	Daughter isotope (Note: Bold italics symbol as daughter – Daughter product is nearly stable.)	Spin and parity (Note: ( ) spin value – Indicates spin with weak assignment arguments.) (Note: # – Values marked # are not purely derived from experimental data, but at least partly from trends of neighboring nuclides (TNN).)	Isotopic abundance
Nuclide	Excitation energy			Discovery year	Half-life	Decay mode	Daughter isotope	Spin and parity	Isotopic abundance
^{219}Np (Note: Heaviest known nucleus, as of 2025, that is beyond the proton drip line.)	93	126	219.031602(99)	2018	570(450) μs	α	^{215}Pa	9/2−#	
^{220}Np	93	127	220.032716(33)	2019	25+14 −7 μs	α	^{216}Pa	1−#	
^{222}Np	93	129	222.033575(41)	2020	480(190) ns	α	^{218}Pa	1−#	
^{223}Np	93	130	223.032913(89)	2017	2.5(8) μs	α	^{219}Pa	(9/2−)	
^{224}Np	93	131	224.034388(31)	2018	38+26 −11 μs	α (83%)	^{220m1}Pa	2−#	
^{224}Np	93	131	224.034388(31)	2018	38+26 −11 μs	α (17%)	^{220m2}Pa	2−#	
^{225}Np	93	132	225.033943(98)	1994	6.5(35) ms	α	^{221}Pa	9/2−#	
^{226}Np	93	133	226.03523(11)	1990	35(10) ms	α	^{222}Pa		
^{227}Np	93	134	227.034975(83)	1990	510(60) ms	α	^{223}Pa	5/2+#	
^{228}Np	93	135	228.03631(11)#	1994	61.4(14) s	EC (59%)	^{228}U	4+#	
^{228}Np	93	135	228.03631(11)#	1994	61.4(14) s	α (41%)	^{224}Pa	4+#	
^{228}Np	93	135	228.03631(11)#	1994	61.4(14) s	β^{+}, SF (0.0126%)	(various)	4+#	
^{229}Np	93	136	229.03629(11)	1968	4.00(18) min	α (68%)	^{225}Pa	5/2+#	
^{229}Np	93	136	229.03629(11)	1968	4.00(18) min	β^{+} (32%)	^{229}U	5/2+#	
^{230}Np	93	137	230.037828(59)	1968	4.6(3) min	β^{+} (>97%)	^{230}U	4+#	
^{230}Np	93	137	230.037828(59)	1968	4.6(3) min	α (<3%)	^{226}Pa	4+#	
^{231}Np	93	138	231.038244(55)	1950	48.8(2) min	β^{+} (98%)	^{231}U	5/2+#	
^{231}Np	93	138	231.038244(55)	1950	48.8(2) min	α (2%)	^{227}Pa	5/2+#	
^{232}Np	93	139	232.04011(11)#	1950	14.7(3) min	β^{+}	^{232}U	(5−)	
^{233}Np	93	140	233.040739(55)	1950	36.2(1) min	β^{+}	^{233}U	5/2+#	
^{233}Np	93	140	233.040739(55)	1950	36.2(1) min	α (0.0007%)	^{229}Pa	5/2+#	
^{234}Np	93	141	234.0428932(90)	1949	4.4(1) d	β^{+}	^{234}U	(0+)	
^{234m}Np				(2020) (Note: Only published in a conference abstract and not a refereed journal)	~9 min	IT	^{234}Np	5+	
^{234m}Np				(2020)	~9 min	EC	^{234}U	5+	
^{235}Np	93	142	235.0440615(15)	1949	396.1(12) d	EC	^{235}U	5/2+	
^{235}Np	93	142	235.0440615(15)	1949	396.1(12) d	α (0.00260%)	^{231}Pa	5/2+	
^{236}Np (Note: Fissile nuclide)	93	143	236.046568(54)	1949	1.53(5)×10^{5} y	EC (86.3%)	^{236}U	(6−)	
^{236}Np	93	143	236.046568(54)	1949	1.53(5)×10^{5} y	β^{−} (13.5%)	^{236}Pu	(6−)	
^{236}Np	93	143	236.046568(54)	1949	1.53(5)×10^{5} y	α (0.16%)	^{232}Pa	(6−)	
^{236m}Np (Note: Order of ground state and isomer is uncertain.)	60(50) keV			1955	22.5(4) h	EC (50%)	^{236}U	(1−)	
^{236m}Np	60(50) keV			1955	22.5(4) h	β^{−} (50%)	^{236}Pu	(1−)	
^{237}Np	93	144	237.0481716(12)	1948	2.144(7)×10^{6} y	α	^{233}Pa	5/2+	Trace (Note: Produced by neutron capture in uranium ore)
^{237}Np	93	144	237.0481716(12)	1948	2.144(7)×10^{6} y	SF (<2×10^{−10}%)	(various)	5/2+	Trace
^{237}Np	93	144	237.0481716(12)	1948	2.144(7)×10^{6} y	CD (<4×10^{−12}%)	^{207}Tl + ^{30}Mg	5/2+	Trace
^{237m}Np	945.20(10) keV			1990	710(40) ns	IT	^{237}Np	13/2−	
^{238}Np	93	145	238.0509446(12)	1949	2.099(2) d	β^{−}	^{238}Pu	2+	
^{238m}Np	2300(200) keV			1970	112(39) ns	SF	(various)		
^{239}Np	93	146	239.0529375(14)	1940	2.356(3) d	β^{−}	^{239}Pu	5/2+	Trace
^{240}Np	93	147	240.056164(18)	1953	61.9(2) min	β^{−}	^{240}Pu	(5+)	Trace (Note: Intermediate decay product of ^{244}Pu)
^{240m}Np	18(14) keV			1960	7.22(2) min	β^{−} (99.88%)	^{240}Pu	(1+)	Trace
^{240m}Np	18(14) keV			1960	7.22(2) min	IT (0.12%)	^{240}Np	(1+)	Trace
^{241}Np	93	148	241.058349(33)	1959	13.9(2) min	β^{−}	^{241}Pu	(5/2+)	
^{242}Np	93	149	242.061738(87)	1979	2.2(2) min	β^{−}	^{242}Pu	(1+)	
^{242m}Np	50(50) keV			1981	5.5(1) min	β^{−}	^{242}Pu	(6+)	
^{243}Np	93	150	243.064204(34)#	1979	1.85(15) min	β^{−}	^{243}Pu	5/2+#	
^{244}Np	93	151	244.06789(11)#	1987	2.29(16) min	β^{−}	^{244}Pu	7−#	
This table header & footer:

== Actinides vs fission products ==
Actinides and fission products by half-life
Actinides by decay chain				Half-life range (a)	Fission products of ^{235}U by yield
4n (Thorium)	4n + 1 (Neptunium)	4n + 2 (Radium)	4n + 3 (Actinium)	Half-life range (a)	4.5–7%	0.04–1.25%	<0.001%
^{228}Ra^{№}				4–6 a		^{155}Eu^{þ}
^{248}Bk				> 9 a
^{244}Cm^{ƒ}	^{241}Pu^{ƒ}	^{250}Cf	^{227}Ac^{№}	10–29 a	^{90}Sr	^{85}Kr	^{113m}Cd^{þ}
^{232}U^{ƒ}		^{238}Pu^{ƒ}	^{243}Cm^{ƒ}	29–97 a	^{137}Cs	^{151}Sm^{þ}	^{121m}Sn
	^{249}Cf^{ƒ}	^{242m}Am^{ƒ}		141–351 a	No fission products have a half-life in the range of 100 a–210 ka ...
	^{241}Am^{ƒ}		^{251}Cf^{ƒ}	430–900 a	No fission products have a half-life in the range of 100 a–210 ka ...
		^{226}Ra^{№}	^{247}Bk	1.3–1.6 ka	No fission products have a half-life in the range of 100 a–210 ka ...
^{240}Pu	^{229}Th	^{246}Cm^{ƒ}	^{243}Am^{ƒ}	4.7–7.4 ka	No fission products have a half-life in the range of 100 a–210 ka ...
	^{245}Cm^{ƒ}	^{250}Cm		8.3–8.5 ka	No fission products have a half-life in the range of 100 a–210 ka ...
			^{239}Pu^{ƒ}	24.1 ka	No fission products have a half-life in the range of 100 a–210 ka ...
		^{230}Th^{№}	^{231}Pa^{№}	32–76 ka	No fission products have a half-life in the range of 100 a–210 ka ...
^{236}Np^{ƒ}	^{233}U^{ƒ}	^{234}U^{№}		150–250 ka	^{99}Tc^{₡}	^{126}Sn
^{248}Cm		^{242}Pu		327–375 ka		^{79}Se^{₡}
				1.33 Ma	^{135}Cs^{₡}
	^{237}Np^{ƒ}			1.61–6.5 Ma	^{93}Zr	^{107}Pd
^{236}U			^{247}Cm^{ƒ}	15–24 Ma		^{129}I^{₡}
^{244}Pu				80 Ma	... nor beyond 15.7 Ma
^{232}Th^{№}		^{238}U^{№}	^{235}U^{ƒ№}	0.7–14.1 Ga	... nor beyond 15.7 Ma
₡, has thermal neutron capture cross section in the range of 8–50 barns; ƒ, fissile; №, primarily a naturally occurring radioactive material (NORM); þ, neutron poison (thermal neutron capture cross section greater than 3k barns)

== Notable isotopes ==
=== Neptunium-235 ===
Neptunium-235 has 142 neutrons and a half-life of 396.1 days. This isotope decays by:

- Electron capture: the decay energy is 0.125 MeV and the decay product is uranium-235.
- Alpha emission: the decay energy is 5.2 MeV and the decay product is protactinium-231.

=== Neptunium-236 ===
Neptunium-236 has 143 neutrons and a half-life of 153,000 years. It can decay by the following methods:

- Electron capture: the decay energy is 0.93 MeV and the decay product is uranium-236. This usually decays (with a half-life of 23 million years) to thorium-232.
- Beta emission: the decay energy is 0.48 MeV and the decay product is plutonium-236. This usually decays (half-life 2.8 years) to uranium-232, which usually decays (half-life 69 years) to thorium-228, which decays in a few years to lead-208.
- Alpha emission: the decay energy is 5.007 MeV and the decay product is protactinium-232. This decays with a half-life of 1.3 days to uranium-232.

Neptunium-236 is a fissile material; it has an estimated critical mass of 6.79 kg (15.0 lb), though precise experimental data is not available (as sufficient material for criticality is not).

^{236}Np is produced in small quantities via the (n,2n) and (γ,n) capture reactions of ^{237}Np, however, it is nearly impossible to separate in any significant quantities from its parent ^{237}Np. It is for this reason that despite its low critical mass and high neutron cross section, it has not been researched extensively as a nuclear fuel in weapons or reactors. Nevertheless, ^{236}Np has been considered for use in mass spectrometry and as a radioactive tracer, because it decays predominantly by beta emission with a long half-life. Several alternative production routes for this isotope have been investigated, namely those that reduce isotopic separation from ^{237}Np or the isomer ^{236m}Np. The most favorable reactions to accumulate ^{236}Np were shown to be proton and deuteron irradiation of uranium-238.

=== Neptunium-237 ===
Neptunium-237 decay scheme (simplified)

^{237}Np decays via the neptunium series, which terminates with thallium-205, which is stable, unlike most other actinides, which decay to stable isotopes of lead. Until the discovery of its alpha decay (with an extremely long half-life), the series was thought to end with bismuth-209.

In 2002, ^{237}Np was shown to be capable of sustaining a chain reaction with fast neutrons, as in a nuclear weapon, with a critical mass of around 60 kg. However, it has a low probability of fission on bombardment with thermal neutrons, which makes it unsuitable as a fuel for light water nuclear power plants (as opposed to fast reactor or accelerator-driven systems, for example).

==== Inventory in spent nuclear fuel ====
^{237}Np is the only neptunium isotope produced in significant quantity in the nuclear fuel cycle, both by successive neutron capture by uranium-235 (which fissions most but not all of the time) and uranium-236, or (n,2n) reactions where a fast neutron occasionally knocks a neutron loose from uranium-238 or isotopes of plutonium. Over the long term, ^{237}Np also forms in spent nuclear fuel as the decay product of americium-241.

^{237}Np is considered to be one of the most mobile radionuclides at the site of the Yucca Mountain nuclear waste repository (Nevada) where oxidizing conditions prevail in the unsaturated zone of the volcanic tuff above the water table.

==== Raw material for ^{238}Pu production ====
When exposed to neutron bombardment ^{237}Np can capture a neutron, undergo beta decay, and become ^{238}Pu, this product being useful as a thermal energy source in a radioisotope thermoelectric generator (RTG or RITEG) for the production of electricity and heat. The first type of thermoelectric generator SNAP (Systems for Nuclear Auxiliary Power) was developed and used by NASA in the 1960's and during the Apollo missions to power the instruments left on the Moon surface by the astronauts. Thermoelectric generators were also embarked on board of deep space probes such as for the Pioneer 10 and 11 missions, the Voyager program, the Cassini–Huygens mission, and New Horizons. They also deliver electrical and thermal power to the Mars Science Laboratory (Curiosity rover) and Mars 2020 mission (Perseverance rover) both exploring the cold surface of Mars. Curiosity and Perseverance rovers are both equipped with the last version of multi-mission RTG, a more efficient and standardized system dubbed MMRTG.

These applications are economically practical where photovoltaic power sources are weak or inconsistent due to probes being too far from the sun or rovers facing climate events that may obstruct sunlight for long periods (like Martian dust storms). Space probes and rovers also make use of the heat output of the generator to keep their instruments and internals warm.

==== Shortage of ^{237}Np stockpiles ====
The long half-life (88 years) of ^{238}Pu and the absence of γ-radiation that could interfere with the operation of on-board electronic components, or irradiate people, makes it the radionuclide of choice for electric thermogenerators.

^{237}Np is therefore a key radionuclide for the production of ^{238}Pu, which is essential for deep space probes requiring a reliable and long-lasting source of energy without maintenance.

Stockpiles of ^{238}Pu built up in the United States since the Manhattan Project, thanks to the Hanford nuclear complex (operating in Washington State from 1943 to 1977) and the Savannah River Site (operating in South Carolina from 1950 to 1988) the development of atomic weapons, are now almost exhausted. The extraction and purification of sufficient new quantities of ^{237}Np from irradiated nuclear fuels is therefore necessary for the resumption of ^{238}Pu production in order to replenish the stocks needed for space exploration by robotic probes.

=== Neptunium-239 ===
Neptunium-239 has 146 neutrons and a half-life of 2.356 days. It is produced via β^{−} decay of the short-lived uranium-239, and undergoes another β^{−} decay to plutonium-239. This is the primary route for making plutonium, as ^{239}U can be made by neutron capture in uranium-238.

Uranium-237 and neptunium-239 are regarded as the leading hazardous radioisotopes in the first hour-to-week period following nuclear fallout from a nuclear detonation, with ^{239}Np dominating "the spectrum for several days".
