= Zabrama =

Zabrama Забрама
- Posyolok
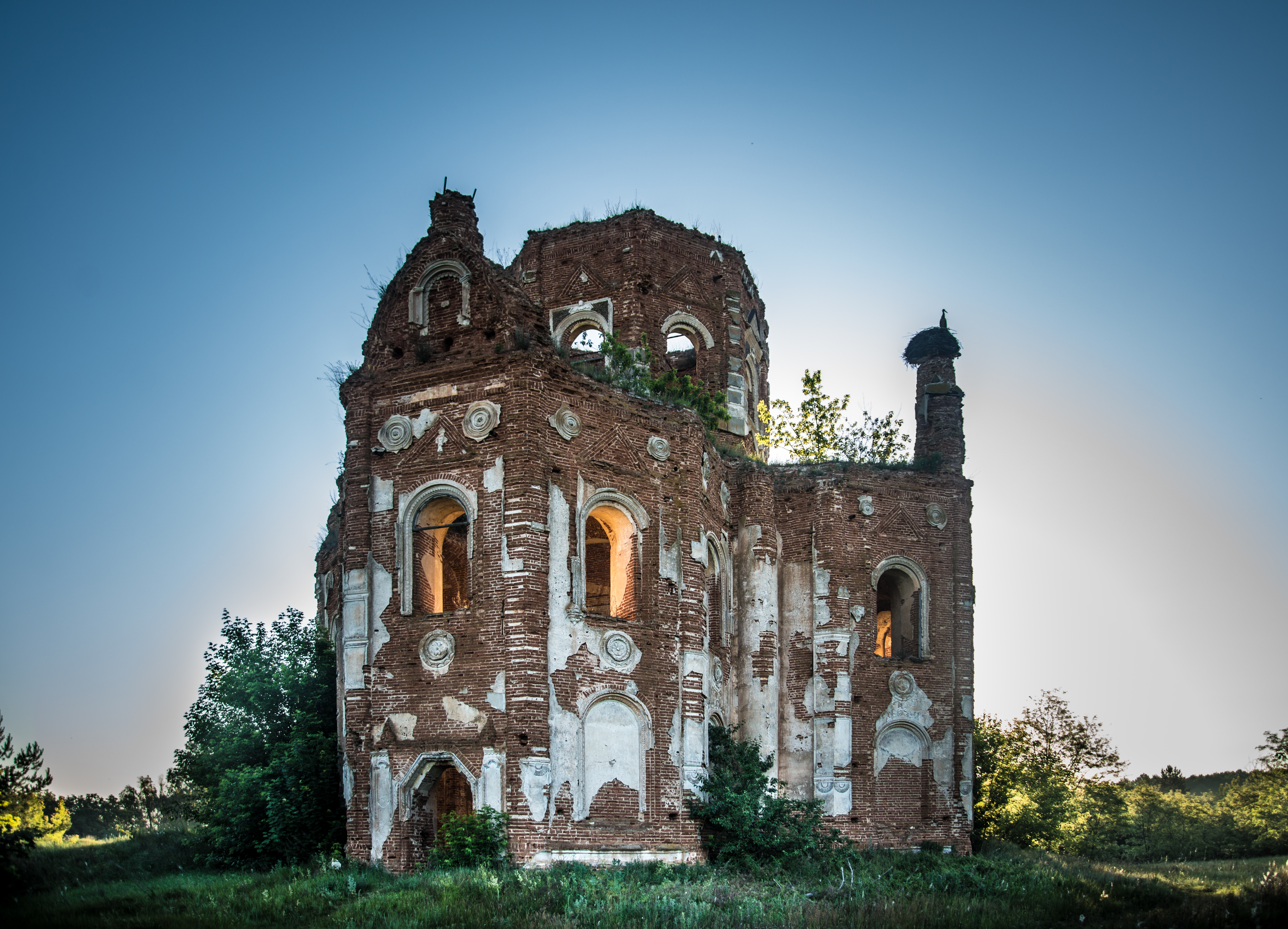
- Ruins of the Monastery, June 2015
- Interactive map of Zabrama
- Location of Zabrama Zabrama (Bryansk Oblast)
- Coordinates: 52°08′12″N 32°18′08″E
- Country: Russia
- Federal subject: Bryansk Oblast
- Administrative district: Klimovsky District
- Rural settlementSelsoviet: Kamenskokhutorsky Rural Settlement

Population
  - Estimate (2013): 27 )
- Time zone: UTC+3 (MSK)
- Postal code: 243053
- OKTMO ID: 15628428106

Zabrama (Russian: Забрама) is a rural locality (a posyolok) in Klimovsky District, Bryansk Oblast, Russia. It is located on the river Snov. A few buildings belonging to the Kamenka Assumption Monastery still stand in the village.

== History ==
Initially the settlement was called Podmonastyrskaya Slobodka (Russian: Подмонастырская Слободка, meaning free settlement close to a monastery). It was situated next to Kamenka Assumption Monastery. The monastery was founded in 1687 and initially was male. In 1764 it was abandoned, but in 1786 restored as a female monastery.

Kamenka Assumption monastery was closed, by the decision of Bryansk Governorate Executive Committee from October 15, 1928. Eventually a start was made on disassembling the stone building and the fence of the monastery for building needs.

After the war, the surviving buildings of the monastery housed an orphanage. In 1954 there was a fire in the orphanage.

In the middle of the twentieth century, Zabrama belonged to kolkhoz Serp i Molot (Russian: Серп и Молот, Sickle and Hammer).

At the beginning of the 21st century, the wooden bridge over the river Snov was in disrepair. A new bridge was built in just one month, and opened October 18, 2012. The new bridge was also wooden.

== Geography ==
Zabrama is located in the southwest of Bryansk Oblast, just 1 km from the border with Ukraine. The village stands on the right bank of the Snov River. On the opposite bank of the river stands village Skachok. The river is crossed by a wooden single track bridge, that is 96 meters long.

3.5 km to the west from Zabrama stands Kamenskiy Khutor, the center of Kamenskokhutorskoye Rural Settlement, of which Zabrama is a part.

== Population ==
Historical population
Year	Pop.
1926	250
2010	33
2013	27

Although in the middle of the 20th century the population of the village was over 200 inhabitants, now the village is almost deserted.

== Landmarks ==
Surviving buildings and structures of Kamenka Assumption Monastery include:

- Assumption Cathedral was erected in the second half of the 18th century. It was built in the style of Ukrainian Baroque.
- Bell tower was erected in the middle of the 19th century. Its architectural style is late classicism with elements of Russian Revival architecture. A fresco depicting the Virgin Mary is preserved in the bell tower.
- Monastery fence of the second half of the 18th century survived in fragments. Two sections of the fence stand on either side of the bell tower.
- Surviving tombstones from the monastery cemetery are now stacked near the Assumption Cathedral.

Spring Monakhova Krynitsa (Russian: Монахова криница, monk's well) is located on the opposite side of the river of Snov, just 500 meters from the monastery. The spring has been declared a national natural monument of regional significance.

== Notable people ==
- Boris Pritychenko, a nuclear physicist, editor-in-chief of the journal Atomic Data and Nuclear Data Tables, was born in Zabrama.
