= Boris Pritychenko =

- Борис Васильевич Притыченко
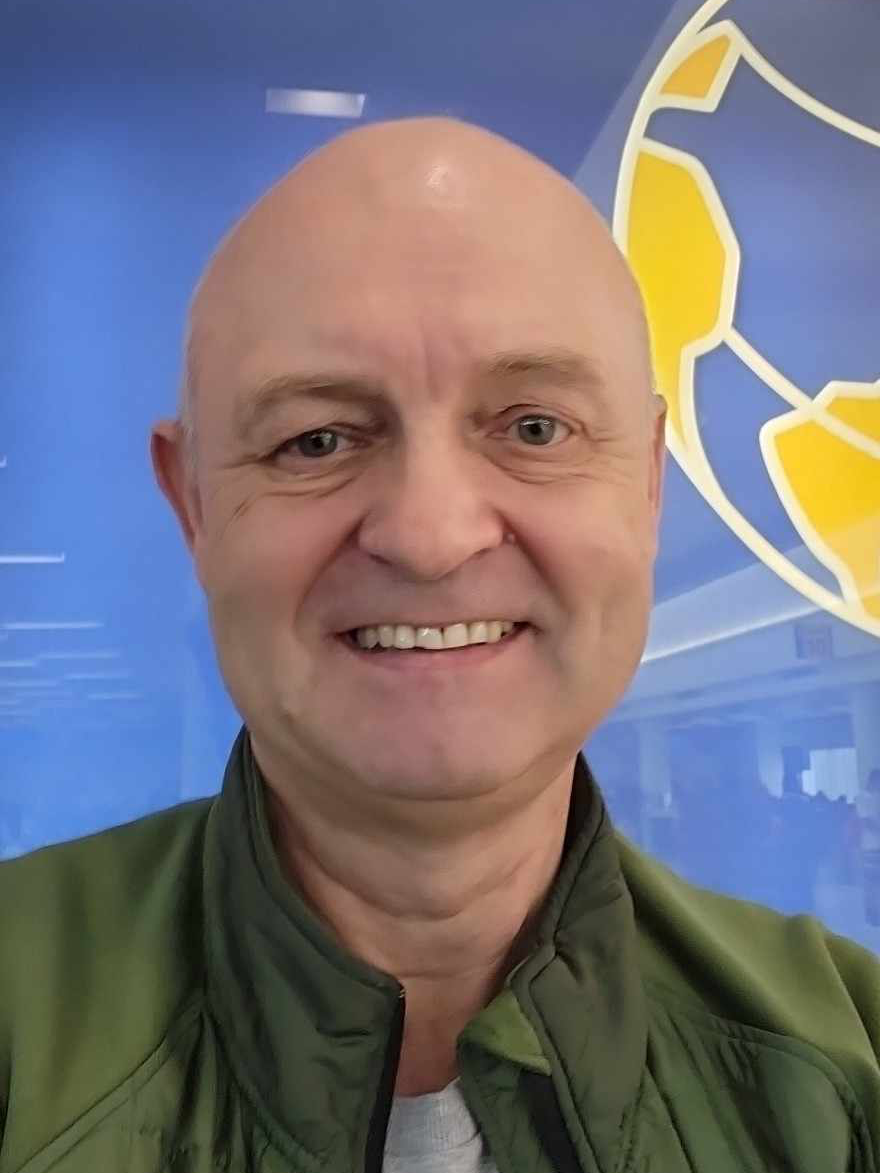
- Citizenship: USSR (prior to 1991); Russia (1991–2002); United States (after 2002)
- Education: University of Kharkiv; Michigan State University
- Scientific career
- Fields: Nuclear physics
- Workplaces: Institute for Nuclear Research; University of California, Berkeley; National Superconducting Cyclotron Laboratory; Brookhaven National Laboratory

Boris Pritychenko (Russian: Борис Васильевич Притыченко) is a Ukrainian–American nuclear physicist. He compiles experimental data, works on nuclear databases, and serves as editor-in-chief of the journal Atomic Data and Nuclear Data Tables.

== Life ==
Pritychenko spent his early years in the Soviet Union. He was born in a small village of Zabrama, Bryansk Oblast in Russia, just 1 km from the border with Ukraine. In 1979, he graduated from high school in Novohrodivka in Donetsk Oblast of Ukraine. Then he studied at the School of Physics and Technology at the University of Kharkiv (now Ukraine), from which he graduated in 1985, earning a diploma in experimental nuclear physics. After graduation, he worked as a research scientist at the Institute for Nuclear Research in Moscow from 1985 till 1991. He also worked at Baksan Neutrino Observatory.

In 1991, Pritychenko moved to the United States, and, from 1991 to 1994, he worked as a visiting scientist at the Center for Particle Astrophysics at the University of California, Berkeley. Afterwards, he studied physics at Michigan State University, earning another MSc degree in December 1996 and a PhD in April 2000. Simultaneously, from 1994 to 2000, he worked as a research assistant at the National Superconducting Cyclotron Laboratory.

From 2000 through 2003, Pritychenko worked as solutions engineer at Plumtree Software, Inc. in San Francisco.

Since 2003, he has been working as scientist at the National Nuclear Data Center of Brookhaven National Laboratory in Upton, New York. He works on the EXFOR, ENDF/B-VII libraries, compiles and evaluates experimental data, develops nuclear energy and astrophysics applications, manages the web services of the National Nuclear Data Center. In 2010, Pritychenko received his third MSc degree, in technological systems management, from Stony Brook University.

Pritychenko has authored over 50 articles on nuclear physics, nuclear astrophysics, and nuclear data. He works as editor-in-chief of the journal Atomic Data and Nuclear Data Tables published by Elsevier.
