= Ionium–thorium dating =

Technique for determining the age of marine sediment

Ionium-thorium dating is a technique for determining the age of marine sediments based upon the quantities present of nearly stable thorium-232 and more radioactive thorium-230. (^{230}Th was once known as ionium, before it was realised it was the same element as ^{232}Th.)

Uranium (in nature, predominantly uranium-238) is soluble in water. However, when it decays into thorium, the latter element is insoluble and so precipitates out to become part of the sediment. Thorium-232 has a half-life of 14.5 billion years, but thorium-230 has a half-life of only 75,200 years, so the ratio is useful for dating sediments up to 400,000 years old. Conversely, this technique can be used to determine the rate of ocean sedimentation over time.

The ionium/thorium method of dating assumes that the proportion of thorium-230 to thorium-232 is a constant during the time period that the sediment layer was formed. Likewise, both thorium-230 and thorium-232 are assumed to precipitate out in a constant ratio; no chemical process favors one form over the other. It must also be assumed that the sediment does not contain any pre-existing particles of eroded rock, known as detritus, that already contain thorium isotopes. Finally, there must not be a process that causes the thorium to shift its position within the sediment. If these assumptions are correct, this dating technique can produce accurate results.
