= Atomic Data and Nuclear Data Tables =

- Discipline: Nuclear physics
- Language: English
- Edited by: Boris Pritychenko

Publication details
- History: 1969-present
- Publisher: Elsevier
- Frequency: Quarterly
- Impact factor: 2.623 (2020)

Standard abbreviations
- ISO 4: At. Data Nucl. Data Tables

Indexing
- CODEN: ADNDAT
- ISSN: 0092-640X
- LCCN: 74640305
- OCLC no.: 644496330

Links
- Journal homepage; Online archive

Atomic Data and Nuclear Data Tables is a quarterly peer-reviewed scientific journal covering nuclear physics. It is published by Elsevier and was established in 1969. The journal was established with the aid of Katharine Way, who later served as its editor until 1973. As of 2016, Boris Pritychenko is the journal's editor-in-chief.

== Abstracting and indexing ==
The journal is abstracted and indexed in:

- Chemical Abstracts Service
- Current Contents/Physics, Chemical, & Earth Sciences
- Energy Research Abstracts
- Science Citation Index
- Scopus

According to the Journal Citation Reports, the journal has a 2020 impact factor of 2.623.
