= Uranium-232 =

Isotope of uranium

General
- Symbol: ^{232}U
- Names: uranium-232
- Protons (Z): 92
- Neutrons (N): 140

Nuclide data
- Half-life (t_{1/2}): 68.9 years
- Parent isotopes: ^{236}Pu (α)^{232}Np (β^{+})^{232}Pa (β^{−})
- Decay products: ^{228}Th

Decay modes
- Decay mode: Decay energy (MeV)
- Alpha: 5.414

U232 radioactive decay chain; yields Pb208.

Uranium-232 (^{232}U) is an isotope of uranium. It has a half-life of 68.9 years and is a side product in the thorium cycle. It has been cited as an obstacle to nuclear proliferation using ^{233}U as the fissile material, because the intense gamma radiation emitted by ^{208}Tl (a daughter of ^{232}U, produced relatively quickly) makes the ^{233}U contaminated with it more difficult to handle.

Production of ^{233}U (through the neutron irradiation of ^{232}Th) invariably produces small amounts of ^{232}U as an impurity, because of parasitic (n,2n) reactions on uranium-233 itself, or on protactinium-233, or on thorium-232:

^{232}Th (n,γ) ^{233}Th (β^{−}) ^{233}Pa (β^{−}) ^{233}U (n,2n) ^{232}U
^{232}Th (n,γ) ^{233}Th (β^{−}) ^{233}Pa (n,2n) ^{232}Pa (β^{−}) ^{232}U
^{232}Th (n,2n) ^{231}Th (β^{−}) ^{231}Pa (n,γ) ^{232}Pa (β^{−}) ^{232}U

Another channel involves neutron capture reaction on small amounts of thorium-230, which is a tiny fraction of natural thorium present due to the decay of uranium-238:

^{230}Th (n,γ) ^{231}Th (β^{−}) ^{231}Pa (n,γ) ^{232}Pa (β^{−}) ^{232}U

The decay chain of ^{232}U quickly yields strong gamma radiation emitters:

^{232}U (α, 68.9 years)
^{228}Th (α, 1.9125 years) (after this, the decay chain is identical to that of ^{232}Th; thorium-232 is nevertheless much less dangerous because its much longer half-life, 14 billion years or 200 million times that of uranium-232, means the build-up of daughters is that much less for equal mass)
^{224}Ra (α, 3.632 days)
^{220}Rn (α, 55.6 s)
^{216}Po (α, 0.144 s)
^{212}Pb (β^{−}, 10.627 h)
^{212}Bi (α, 60.55 min, 0.78 MeV), with 35.94% branching ratio to
^{208}Tl (β^{−}, 3.053 min), 99.75% chance to emit 2.6 MeV gamma ray
^{208}Pb (stable)

This makes manual handling in a glove box with only light shielding (as commonly done with plutonium) too hazardous, except in a period short compared to the Th-228 half-life just after chemical separation of the uranium, and instead requiring remote manipulation for fuel fabrication.

Unusually for an isotope with even mass number, ^{232}U has a significant neutron absorption cross section for fission (thermal neutrons 75 barns (b), resonance integral 380 b) as well as for neutron capture (thermal 73 b, resonance integral 280 b). This makes it a fissile isotope, though using it alone in a reactor or bomb is not reasonable.

Lighter: uranium-231	Uranium-232 is an isotope of uranium	Heavier: uranium-233
Decay product of: plutonium-236 (α) neptunium-232 (β^{+}) protactinium-232 (β^{−})	Decay chain of uranium-232	Decays to: thorium-228 (α)
