= National Nuclear Data Center =

The National Nuclear Data Center is an organization based in the Brookhaven National Laboratory that acts as a repository for data regarding nuclear chemistry, such as nuclear structure, decay, and reaction data, as well as historical information regarding previous experiments and literature. According to the ResearchGATE scientific network, "The National Nuclear Data Center NNDC collects, evaluates, and disseminates nuclear physics data for basic nuclear research and applied nuclear technologies." The current Center Head is David Brown.

== History ==
The predecessor group to the NNDC was founded in 1951 when a group known as the Brookhaven Neutron Cross Section Compilation Group was formed at the Brookhaven National Laboratory. In 1955 this group published the reference book "BNL-325," which had to do with the cross-sections of neutrons. After being renamed the Sigma Center, the group was moved to the Reactor Physics Division of the Nuclear Engineering Department in the Brookhaven Lab in 1960. At around that time, the Cross Section Evaluation Group was formed in the same division, and the two groups worked closely together and shared support personnel. In 1964, nuclear theorist Charles Porter, head of the Cross Section Evaluation Group, died, and John Stehn, head of the Sigma Center, ended up becoming the acting head of both the Sigma Center and the Group.

1967 saw the two groups merge into the National Neutron Cross Section Center (NNCSC), with Sol Pearlstein as acting director, officially being appointed Director of the NNCSC in 1968. In 1977, the Center was given the additional responsibility for nuclear structure and decay data by the Energy Research and Development Administration (ERDA), the predecessor of the Department of Energy, and its name was then changed to the National Nuclear Data Center. Charles Dunford served as Center Head from 1992 to 2002, with the exception of a two-year leave of absence (1993-1995) when he served as Section Head for the International Atomic Energy Agency (IAEA) Nuclear Data Section. During his leave of absence Mulki Bhat was named Acting Center Head. Since then, the head has been succeeded by Pavel Oblozinskiy, Michal Herman and then Alejandro Sonzogni and David Brown.

== Present activities ==
The NNDC carries out its original mission of nuclear physics and nuclear chemistry data storage, evaluation and dissemination to this day. This data is to be used "for basic nuclear research, applied nuclear technologies including energy, shielding, medical and homeland security." In 2004, the NNDC began a modernization program which consisted of digitization of data and offering new web services. As part of the program, the Center has upgraded to Linux-based data storage and computing platforms, as well as implementing the additional use of Java and Sybase relational database software.
