= Americium-241 =

Radioactive isotope of Americium

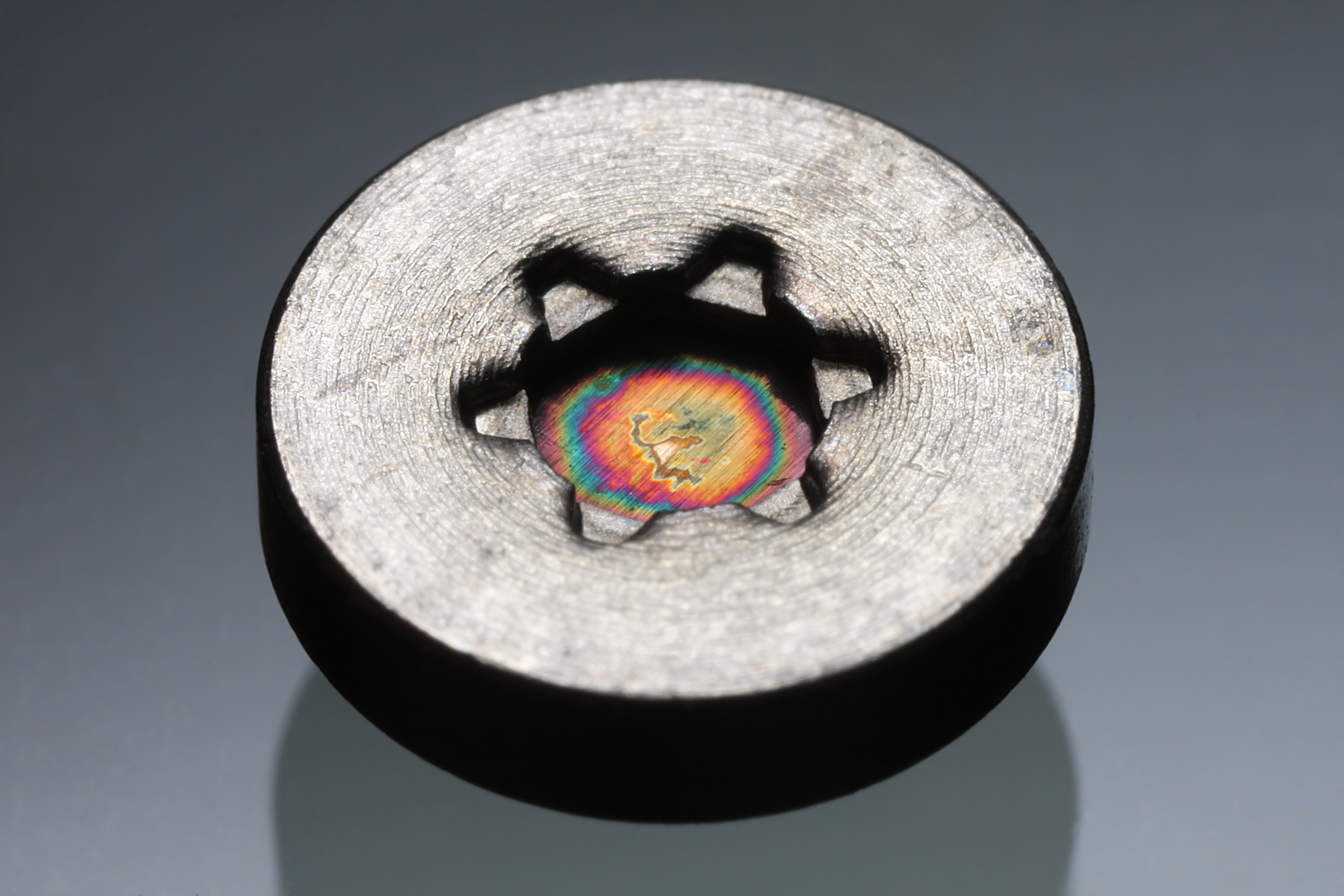
- Small button containing ^{241}AmO_{2} from a smoke alarm

General
- Symbol: ^{241}Am
- Names: americium-241
- Protons (Z): 95
- Neutrons (N): 146

Nuclide data
- Natural abundance: 0 (synthetic)
- Half-life (t_{1/2}): 432.6±0.6 years
- Isotope mass: 241.0568273(12) Da
- Spin: 5/2−
- Excess energy: 52934.3±1.1 keV
- Nuclear binding energy: 7543.2795(46) keV
- Parent isotopes: ^{241}Pu (β^{−})^{241}Cm (EC)^{245}Bk (α)
- Decay products: ^{237}Np

Decay modes
- Decay mode: Decay energy (MeV)
- α-decay (alpha): 5.486
- γ-emission (gamma): 0.0595409

Americium-241 (^{241}Am, Am-241) is an isotope of americium. Like all isotopes of americium, it is radioactive, with a half-life of 432.6 years. ^{241}Am is the most prevalent americium isotope in radioactive waste. It is used in ionization-type smoke detectors and is a potential fuel for long-lifetime radioisotope thermoelectric generators (RTGs). Its common parent nuclides are ^{241}Pu (by beta decay), ^{241}Cm (by electron capture), and ^{245}Bk (by alpha decay). ^{241}Am is fissile, with the critical mass of a bare sphere of 57.6–75.6 kilograms (127.0–166.7 lb) (diameter of 19–21 centimetres (7.5–8.3 in)). Americium-241 has a specific activity of 3.43 Ci/g (126.91 GBq/g). It is commonly found in the form of americium-241 dioxide (^{241}AmO_{2}). The presence of ^{241}Am in plutonium is determined by the original concentration of plutonium-241 (which decays to it) and its age. Older samples of plutonium containing ^{241}Pu build up ^{241}Am and may require chemical removable of americium-241 (e.g., during reworking of plutonium's pits).

== Nucleosynthesis ==
Americium-241 has been produced in small quantities in nuclear reactors for decades, and many kilograms of ^{241}Am have been accumulated by now. Since it was first offered for sale in 1962, after a long period of price stability due to its complex production process, its price, about US$25,000 per gram of ^{241}Am, including packaging/dispensing fees, has risen significantly since then, especially in recent years.

Americium-241 is synthesized by three neutron captures on uranium-238 present in reactors:

$$\mathrm{^{238}_{\ 92}U\ \xrightarrow {(n,\gamma)} \ ^{239}_{\ 92}U\ \xrightarrow [23.5 \ min]{\beta^-} \ ^{239}_{\ 93}Np\ \xrightarrow [2.3565 \ d]{\beta^-} \ ^{239}_{\ 94}Pu\ \xrightarrow {2~(n,\gamma)} \ ^{241}_{\ 94}Pu\ \xrightarrow [14.35 \ yr]{\beta^-} \ ^{241}_{\ 95}Am}$$

The plutonium present in spent nuclear fuel contains about 12% of ^{241}Pu. Because it converts to ^{241}Am, ^{241}Pu can be extracted and may be used to generate further (isotopically pure) ^{241}Am. However, this process is rather slow: half of the original amount of ^{241}Pu decays to ^{241}Am after about 14 years, and the ^{241}Am amount reaches a maximum after 70 years.

The obtained ^{241}Am can be used for generating heavier americium isotopes by further neutron capture inside a nuclear reactor. In a light water reactor (LWR), 79% of neutron captures on ^{241}Am convert to ^{242}Am and 10% to its nuclear isomer ^{242m}Am:

79%: $\mathrm{^{241}_{\ 95}Am\ \xrightarrow {(n,\gamma)} \ ^{242}_{\ 95}Am}$

=== Role in nuclear fuel ===
Americium has a lower valence and lower electronegativity than plutonium, neptunium or uranium, so in most nuclear reprocessing, americium tends to fractionate with the alkaline fission products – lanthanides, strontium, caesium, barium, yttrium – rather than with lighter actinides. Americium is therefore not recycled into new nuclear fuel unless special efforts are made.

In a thermal reactor, ^{241}Am captures a neutron to become americium-242, which quickly becomes curium-242 (or, 17.3% of the time, ^{242}Pu) via beta decay. Both ^{242}Cm and ^{242}Pu are much less likely to absorb a neutron, and even less likely to fission; however, ^{242}Cm is short-lived (half-life 160 days) and almost always undergoes alpha decay to ^{238}Pu rather than capturing another neutron. In short, most ^{241}Am needs to absorb two neutrons before again becoming a fissile isotope, except that that becomes ^{242m}Am (fissile) or fissions directly.

== Decay ==
Americium-241 decays by alpha emission, with a low-energy gamma ray byproduct. The α-decay is shown as follows:

$\mathrm{^{241\!\,}_{\ 95}Am\ \overset{432.6y}{\longrightarrow} \ ^{237}_{\ 93}Np~+~^{4}_{2}\alpha^{2+} +\gamma~59.5409~keV}$

The principal α-decay energies are 85% 5.486 MeV, 13% 5.443 MeV, and 2% 5.388 MeV. The principal gamma ray is 59.5409 keV (36%); smaller amounts are emitted at other energies such as 13.9, 17.8, and 26.4 keV.

Very rarely, americium-241 undergoes spontaneous fission, with a branching ratio of 3.6×10^{−12} or 1.2/s/g of ^{241}Am.

== Applications ==
=== Ionization-type smoke detector ===
Americium-241 is the only synthetic isotope to have found its way into the household, where the most common type of smoke detector (the ionization type) uses ^{241}AmO_{2} (americium-241 dioxide) as a source of ionizing radiation. This isotope is preferred over ^{226}Ra because it emits 5 times more alpha particles and relatively little harmful gamma radiation. With its half-life of 432.6 years, the americium in a smoke detector decreases and includes about 3% neptunium after 19 years, and about 5% after 32 years. The amount of americium in a typical new smoke detector is 0.29 micrograms (4.5×10^{−6} grains) (about 1/3000 the weight of a small grain of sand) with an activity of 1 microcurie (37 kBq). Some old industrial smoke detectors (notably from the Pyrotronics Corporation) can contain up to 80 microcuries (3,000 kBq). The amount of ^{241}Am declines slowly as it decays into neptunium-237 (^{237}Np), a different transuranic element with a much longer half-life (2.144 million years). The radiated alpha particles pass through an ionization chamber, an air-filled space between two electrodes, which allows a small, constant electric current to pass between the capacitor plates due to the radiation ionizing the air space between. Any smoke that enters the chamber blocks/absorbs some of the alpha particles from freely passing through and reduces the ionization and therefore causes a drop in the current. The alarm's circuitry detects this drop in the current and as a result, triggers the piezoelectric buzzer to sound. Compared to the alternative optical smoke detector, the ionization smoke detector is cheaper and can detect particles which are too small to produce significant light scattering. However, it is more prone to false alarms.

==== Manufacturing process ====
The process for making the americium used in the buttons on ionization-type smoke detectors begins with americium dioxide. The ^{241}AmO_{2} is thoroughly mixed with gold, shaped into a briquette, and fused by pressure and heat at over 1,470 °F (800 °C). A backing of silver and a front covering of gold (or an alloy of gold or palladium) are applied to the briquette and sealed by hot forging. The briquette is then processed through several stages of cold rolling to achieve the desired thickness and levels of radiation emission. The final thickness is about 0.008 inches (0.20 mm), with the gold cover representing about one percent of the thickness. The resulting foil strip, which is about 0.8 inches (20 mm) wide, is cut into sections 39 inches (1 m) long. The sources are punched out of the foil strip. Each disc, about 0.2 inches (5.1 mm) in diameter, is mounted in a metal holder, usually made of aluminium. The holder is the housing, which is the majority of what is seen on the button. The thin rim on the holder is rolled over to completely seal the cut edge around the disc.

=== RTG (radioisotope thermoelectric generator) power generation ===
As ^{241}Am has a roughly similar half-life to ^{238}Pu (432.6 years Am-241, 87.7 years Pu-238, decay energies nearly the same), it has been proposed as an active isotope of radioisotope thermoelectric generators, for use in spacecraft. Even though americium-241 produces less heat and electricity than plutonium-238 (the power yield is 114.7 milliwatts per gram [3.25 watts per ounce] for ^{241}Am vs. 570 mW/g [16 W/oz] for ^{238}Pu) and its radiation poses a greater threat to humans owing to gamma emission, it has advantages for long duration missions with its significantly longer half-life. The European Space Agency is working on RTGs based on americium-241 for its space probes as a result of the global shortage of plutonium-238 and easy access to americium-241 in Europe from nuclear waste reprocessing.

Its shielding requirements in an RTG are the second lowest of all possible isotopes: only ^{238}Pu requires less. An advantage over ^{238}Pu is that it is produced as nuclear waste already. Prototype designs of ^{241}Am RTGs expect 2–2.2 W_{e}/kg for a 5–50 W_{e} design, putting ^{241}Am RTGs at parity with ^{238}Pu RTGs within that power range, as the vast majority of the mass of an RTG is not the radioisotope, but the thermoelectrics, radiators, and isotope containment mass.

=== Neutron source ===
^{241}Am, normally as the oxide, pressed with beryllium can be an efficient neutron source, since they emit alpha particles during radioactive decay:

$$\mathrm{^{241\!\,}_{\ 95}Am\ \overset{432.2y}{\longrightarrow} \ ^{237}_{\ 93}Np\ +\ ^{4}_{2}\alpha^{2+} +\ \gamma~59.5~keV}$$

Here americium acts as the alpha source, and beryllium produces neutrons owing to its large cross-section for the (α,n) nuclear reaction:

$$\mathrm{^{9}_{4}Be\ +\ ^{4}_{2}\alpha^{2+} \longrightarrow \ ^{12}_{\ 6}C\ +\ ^{1}_{0}n\ +\ \gamma}$$

The most widespread use of ^{241}AmBe neutron sources is a neutron probe – a device used to measure the quantity of water present in soil, as well as moisture/density for quality control in highway construction. ^{241}Am neutron sources are also used in well logging applications, as well as in neutron radiography, tomography, and other radiochemical investigations.

=== Production of other elements ===
Chart displaying actinides and their decays and transmutations.

Americium-241 is sometimes used as a starting material for the production of other transuranic elements and transactinides – for example, neutron bombardment of ^{241}Am yields ^{242}Am:

$\mathrm{^{241}_{\ 95}Am\ \xrightarrow {(n,\gamma)} \ ^{242}_{\ 95}Am}$

From there, 82.7% of ^{242}Am decays to ^{242}Cm and 17.3% to ^{242}Pu:

82.7% → $\mathrm{^{241}_{\ 95}Am\ \xrightarrow {(n,\gamma)} \ ^{242}_{\ 95}Am\ \xrightarrow [16.02 \ h]{\beta^-} \ ^{242}_{\ 96}Cm}$

17.3%→ $\mathrm{^{241}_{\ 95}Am\ \xrightarrow {(n,\gamma)} \ ^{242}_{\ 95}Am\ \xrightarrow [16.02 \ h]{\beta^+} \ ^{242}_{\ 94}Pu}$

In the nuclear reactor, ^{242}Am is also up-converted by neutron capture to ^{243}Am and ^{244}Am, which transforms by β-decay to ^{244}Cm:

$$\mathrm{^{242}_{\ 95}Am\xrightarrow {(n,\gamma)}~^{243}_{\ 95}Am\ \xrightarrow {(n,\gamma)} \ ^{244}_{\ 95}Am\ \xrightarrow [10.1 \ h]{\beta^-} \ ^{244}_{\ 96}Cm}$$

The element berkelium (as ^{243}Bk) was first intentionally produced and identified by bombarding ^{241}Am with alpha particles, in 1949, by the same Berkeley group, using the same 60-inch (1,500 mm) cyclotron that had been used for many previous experiments.

=== Spectrometer ===
Americium-241 has been used as a portable source of both gamma rays and alpha particles for a number of medical and industrial uses. The 59.5409 keV (9.53950 fJ) gamma ray emissions from ^{241}Am in such sources can be used for indirect analysis of materials in radiography and X-ray fluorescence spectroscopy, as well as for quality control in fixed nuclear density gauges and nuclear densometers. For example, this isotope has been employed to gauge glass thickness to help create flat glass. Americium-241 is also suitable for calibration of gamma-ray spectrometers in the low-energy range, since its spectrum consists of nearly a single peak and negligible Compton continuum (at least three orders of magnitude lower intensity).

=== Medicine ===
Gamma rays from americium-241 have been used to provide passive diagnosis of thyroid function. This medical application is now obsolete. Americium-241's gamma rays can provide reasonable quality radiographs, with a 10-minute exposure time. ^{241}Am radiographs have only been taken experimentally due to the long exposure time which increases the effective dose to living tissue. Reducing exposure duration reduces the chance of ionization events causing damage to cells and DNA, and is a critical component in the "time, distance, shielding" maxim used in radiation protection.

== Hazards ==
Americium-241 has the same general hazards as other americium isotopes: it is both extremely toxic and radioactive. Though α-particles can be stopped by a sheet of paper, there are serious health concerns for ingestion of α-emitters. Americium and its isotopes are also very chemically toxic as well, in the form of heavy-metal toxicity. As little as 0.03 microcuries (1.1 kBq) is the maximum permissible body burden for ^{241}Am.

Americium-241 is an α-emitter with a weak γ-ray byproduct. Safely handling americium-241 requires knowing and following proper safety precautions, as without them it would be extremely dangerous. Its specific gamma dose constant is 3.14×10^{−1} mR/hr/mCi or 8.48×10^{−5} mSv/hr/MBq at 1 metre (3 ft 3 in).

If consumed, americium-241 is excreted within a few days and only 0.05% is absorbed in the blood. From there, roughly 45% of it goes to the liver and 45% to the bones, and the remaining 10% is excreted. The uptake to the liver depends on the individual and increases with age. In the bones, americium is first deposited over cortical and trabecular surfaces and slowly redistributes over the bone with time. The biological half-life of ^{241}Am is 50 years in the bones and 20 years in the liver, whereas in the gonads (testicles and ovaries) it remains permanently; in all these organs, americium promotes formation of cancer cells as a result of its radioactivity.

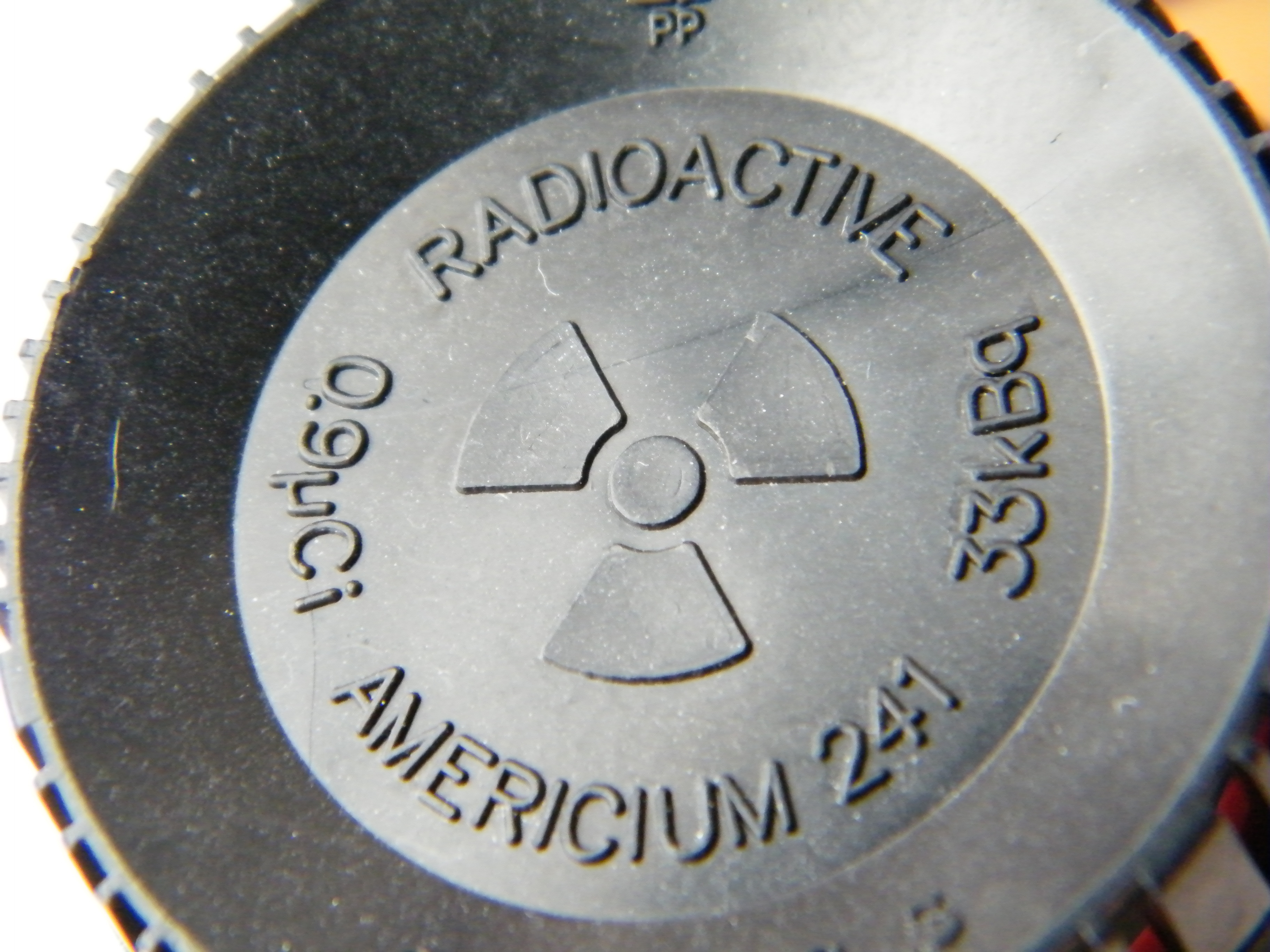
A container of americium-241 in a smoke detector

Americium-241 often enters landfills from discarded smoke detectors. The rules associated with the disposal of smoke detectors are relaxed in most jurisdictions. In the U.S., the "Radioactive Boy Scout" David Hahn was able to concentrate americium-241 from smoke detectors after managing to buy a hundred of them at remainder prices and also stealing a few. There have been a few cases of exposure to americium-241, the worst being Harold McCluskey who, at age 64, was exposed to 500 times the occupational standard for americium-241 as a result of an explosion in his lab. McCluskey died at age 75, not as a result of exposure, but of a heart disease which he had before the accident. Americium-241 has also been detected in the oceans as a result of nuclear testing conducted by various nations.

== See also ==
- Isotopes of americium
- David Hahn
