= Plutonium-242 =

Isotope of plutonium

General
- Symbol: ^{242}Pu
- Names: plutonium-242
- Protons (Z): 94
- Neutrons (N): 148

Nuclide data
- Half-life (t_{1/2}): 375000 years
- Isotope mass: 242.059741 Da
- Decay products: ^{238}U

Decay modes
- Decay mode: Decay energy (MeV)
- alpha decay: 4.984

Plutonium-242 (^{242}Pu or Pu-242) is the second longest-lived isotope of plutonium, with a half-life of 375,000 years. The half-life of ^{242}Pu is about 15 times that of ^{239}Pu; so it is one-fifteenth as radioactive, and not one of the larger contributors to nuclear waste radioactivity. ^{242}Pu's gamma ray emissions are also weaker than those of the other isotopes. As the direct parent of uranium-238 it is part of the uranium series decay chain.

It is not fissile (but it is fissionable by fast neutrons), and its neutron capture cross section is low. Like the other even isotopes of plutonium it has a significant rate of spontaneous fission.

== In the nuclear fuel cycle ==
Transmutation flow in LWR

Plutonium-242 is produced by successive neutron capture on ^{239}Pu, ^{240}Pu, and ^{241}Pu. The odd-mass isotopes ^{239}Pu and ^{241}Pu have about a 3/4 chance of undergoing fission on capture of a thermal neutron and about a 1/4 chance of retaining the neutron and becoming the following isotope. The proportion of ^{242}Pu is low at low burnup but increases faster than linearly due to the intermediate isotopes' buildup.

^{242}Pu has a particularly low cross section for thermal neutron capture; and it takes three neutron absorptions to become another fissile isotope (curium-245) and then one more neutron to undergo fission. Even then, there is a chance of the fourth neutron being absorbed instead of fissioning, leading to curium-246 (with again only a small neutron cross-section), so the mean number of neutrons absorbed until fission is even higher than 4. Therefore, ^{242}Pu is particularly unsuited to recycling in a thermal reactor and would be better used in a fast reactor where it can be fissioned directly. However, ^{242}Pu's low cross section means that relatively little of it is transmuted during one cycle in a thermal reactor.
