= Selenium-79 =

Long-lived radioisotope of selenium

General
- Symbol: ^{79}Se
- Names: selenium-79
- Protons (Z): 34
- Neutrons (N): 45

Nuclide data
- Natural abundance: trace
- Half-life (t_{1/2}): 327000±28000 years
- Spin: 7/2+
- Excess energy: −75917.46±0.22 keV
- Nuclear binding energy: 8695.592±0.003 keV
- Decay products: ^{79}Br

Decay modes
- Decay mode: Decay energy (MeV)
- Beta decay: 0.151

Selenium-79 is a radioisotope of selenium present in spent nuclear fuel and the wastes resulting from reprocessing this fuel. It is one of only seven long-lived fission products. Its fission yield is low (about 0.04%), as it is near the lower end of the mass range for fission products. Its half-life has been variously reported as 650,000 years, 65,000 years, 1.13 million years, 480,000 years, 295,000 years, 377,000 years, and most recently and the best current value, 327,000 years.

^{79}Se decays to ^{79}Br by emitting a beta particle with no attendant gamma radiation (i.e., 100% β decay). This complicates its detection and liquid scintillation counting (LSC) is required for measuring it in environmental samples. The low specific activity (5.1 × 10^{8} Bq/g) and relatively low energy (maximum 151 keV) of its beta particles limit the radioactive hazards of this isotope.

Performance assessment calculations for the Belgian deep geological repository estimated ^{79}Se may be the major contributor to activity release in terms of becquerels (decays per second), "attributable partly to the uncertainties about its migration behaviour in the Boom Clay and partly to its conversion factor in the biosphere." (p. 169). However, "calculations for the Belgian safety assessments use a half-life of 65 000 years" (p. 177), much less than the currently estimated half-life, and "the migration parameters ... have been estimated very cautiously for ^{79}Se." (p. 179)

Neutron absorption cross sections for ^{79}Se have been estimated at 50 barns for thermal neutrons and 60.9 barns for resonance integral.

Selenium-80 and selenium-82 have higher fission yields, about 20 times the yield of ^{79}Se in the case of uranium-235, 6 times in the case of plutonium-239 or uranium-233, and 14 times in the case of plutonium-241.

== Mobility of selenium in the environment ==
Due to redox-disequilibrium, selenium could be very resistant to abiotic chemical reduction and be released from the waste (spent fuel or vitrified waste) as selenate (SeO^{2–}_{4}), a soluble Se(VI) species, not sorbed onto clay minerals. Without considering any solubility limit and retardation for aqueous selenium, the dose of ^{79}Se is comparable to that of ^{129}I. Moreover, selenium is an essential micronutrient as it is present in the catalytic centers in the glutathione peroxidase, an enzyme needed by many organisms for the protection of their cell membrane against oxidative stress damages; therefore, radioactive ^{79}Se can be easily bioconcentrated in the food web. In the presence of nitrate, a common groundwater contaminant, even reduced forms of selenium could be easily oxidised and mobilised.

Long-lived fission products
Nuclide	t_{1/2}	Yield	Q (Note: Decay energy is split among β, neutrino, and γ if any.)	βγ
	(Ma)	(%) (Note: Per 65 thermal neutron fissions of ^{235}U and 35 of ^{239}Pu.)	(keV)	
^{99}Tc	0.211	6.1385	294	β
^{126}Sn	0.23	0.1084	4050 (Note: Has decay energy 380 keV, but its decay product ^{126}Sb has decay energy 3.67 MeV.)	βγ
^{79}Se	0.33	0.0447	151	β
^{135}Cs	1.33	6.9110 (Note: Lower in thermal reactors because ^{135}Xe, its predecessor, readily absorbs neutrons.)	269	β
^{93}Zr	1.61	5.4575	91	βγ
^{107}Pd	6.5	1.2499	33	β
^{129}I	16.1	0.8410	194	βγ

== See also ==
- Isotopes of selenium
- ANL factsheet
- Journal of Analytical Atomic Spectrometry
