= Neutron capture =

Atomic nuclear process

Neutron capture is a nuclear reaction in which an atomic nucleus and one or more neutrons collide and merge to form a heavier nucleus. Since neutrons have no electric charge, they can enter a nucleus more easily than positively charged protons, which are repelled electrostatically.

Neutron capture plays a significant role in the cosmic nucleosynthesis of heavy elements. In stars it can proceed in two ways: as a rapid process (r-process) or a slow process (s-process). Nuclei of masses greater than 56 cannot be formed by exothermic thermonuclear reactions (i.e., by nuclear fusion) but can be formed by neutron capture. Neutron capture on protons yields a line at 2.223 MeV predicted and commonly observed in solar flares.

== Neutron capture at small neutron flux ==
Decay scheme of ^{198}Au

At small neutron flux, as in a nuclear reactor, a single neutron is captured by a nucleus. For example, when natural gold (^{197}Au) is irradiated by neutrons (n), the isotope ^{198}Au is formed in a highly excited state, and quickly decays to the ground state of ^{198}Au by the emission of gamma rays (𝛾). In this process, the mass number increases by one. This is written as a formula in the form ^{197}Au + n → ^{198}Au + γ, or in short form ^{197}Au(n,γ)^{198}Au. If thermal neutrons are used, the process is called thermal capture.

The isotope ^{198}Au is a beta emitter that decays into the mercury isotope ^{198}Hg. In this process, the atomic number rises by one.

== Neutron capture at high neutron flux ==
The r-process happens inside stars if the neutron flux density is so high that the atomic nucleus has no time to decay via beta emission between neutron captures. The mass number therefore rises by a large amount while the atomic number (i.e., the element) stays the same. When further neutron capture is no longer possible, the highly unstable nuclei decay via many β^{−} decays to beta-stable isotopes of higher-numbered elements.

== Capture cross section ==
The absorption neutron cross section of an isotope of a chemical element is the effective cross-sectional area that an atom of that isotope presents to absorption and is a measure of the probability of neutron capture. It is usually measured in barns.

Absorption cross section is often highly dependent on neutron energy. In general, the likelihood of absorption is proportional to the time the neutron is in the vicinity of the nucleus. The time spent in the vicinity of the nucleus is inversely proportional to the relative velocity between the neutron and nucleus. Other more specific issues modify this general principle. Two of the most specified measures are the cross section for thermal neutron absorption and the resonance integral, which considers the contribution of absorption peaks at certain neutron energies specific to a particular nuclide, usually above the thermal range, but encountered as neutron moderation slows the neutron from an original high energy.

The thermal energy of the nucleus also has an effect; as temperatures rise, Doppler broadening increases the chance of catching a resonance peak. In particular, the increase in uranium-238's ability to absorb neutrons at higher temperatures (and to do so without fissioning) is a negative feedback mechanism that helps keep nuclear reactors under control.

== Thermochemical significance ==
Neutron capture is involved in the formation of isotopes of chemical elements. The energy of neutron capture thus intervenes in the standard enthalpy of formation of isotopes.

== Uses ==
Neutron activation analysis can be used to remotely detect the chemical composition of materials. This is because different elements release different characteristic radiation when they absorb neutrons. This makes it useful in many fields related to mineral exploration and security.

== Neutron absorbers ==
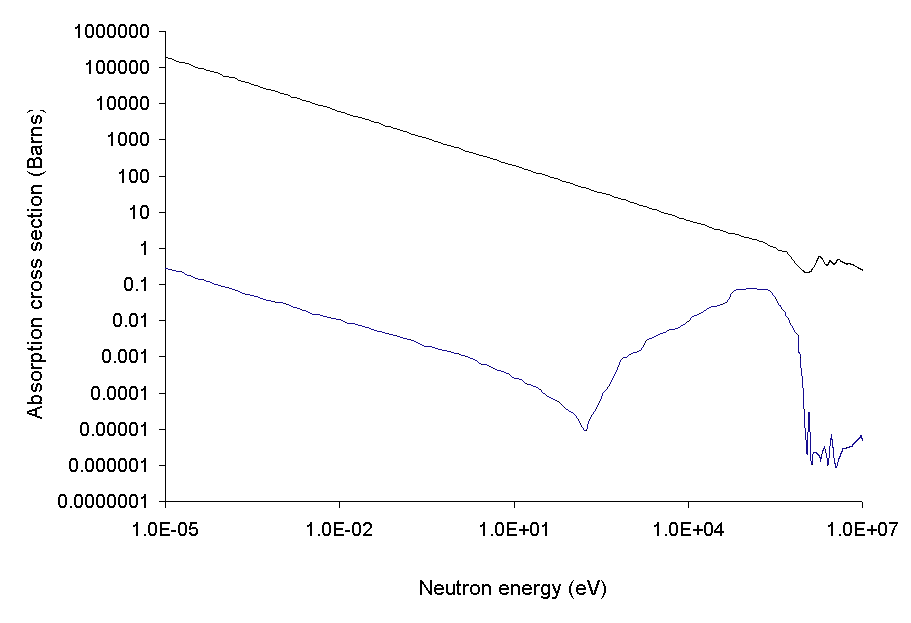
Neutron cross section of boron (top curve is for ^{10}B and bottom curve for ^{11}B)

In engineering, the most important neutron absorber is ^{10}B, used as boron carbide in nuclear reactor control rods or as boric acid as a coolant water additive in pressurized water reactors. Other neutron absorbers used in nuclear reactors are xenon, cadmium, hafnium, gadolinium, cobalt, samarium, titanium, dysprosium, erbium, europium, molybdenum and ytterbium. All of these occur in nature as mixtures of various isotopes, some of which are excellent neutron absorbers. They may occur in compounds such as molybdenum boride, hafnium diboride, titanium diboride, dysprosium titanate and gadolinium titanate.

Hafnium absorbs neutrons avidly and it can be used in reactor control rods. However, it is found in the same ores as zirconium, which shares the same outer electron shell configuration and thus has similar chemical properties. Their nuclear properties are profoundly different: hafnium absorbs neutrons 600 times better than zirconium. The latter, being essentially transparent to neutrons, is prized for internal reactor parts, including the metallic cladding of the fuel rods. To use these elements in their respective applications, the zirconium must be separated from the naturally co-occurring hafnium. This can be accomplished economically with ion-exchange resins.

== See also ==
- Beta decay
- Induced radioactivity
- List of particles
- Neutron emission
- Radioactive decay
- Rays: α — β — γ — δ
- p-process (proton capture)
