= Dorin N. Poenaru =

Romanian nuclear physicist and engineer (born 1936)

- Born: April 9, 1936 (age 90); Suiug, Bihor County, Kingdom of Romania
- Citizenship: Romania
- Education: Politehnica University of Bucharest; University of Bucharest
- Known for: Cluster decay
- Spouse: Dr. Ileana Hana Plonski
- Scientific career
- Fields: Nuclear physics
- Workplaces: Horia Hulubei National Institute of Physics and Nuclear Engineering

Dorin Mircea Stelian Poenaru (born April 9, 1936, Suiug, Bihor County) is a Romanian nuclear physicist and engineer. He contributed to the theory of heavy particle radioactivity (cluster decay).

== Education ==
Poenaru completed his higher education at the Emanuil Gojdu National College in Oradea where in 1953 he received a diploma of merit. After passing the entrance examination, he studied at the Faculty of Electronics and Telecommunication of Politehnica University of Bucharest from which he graduated in 1958. In 1971, he received a B.A. in theoretical physics from the University of Bucharest while working in electronic engineering at the Institute of Atomic Physics (IFA) of the Romanian Academy in Măgurele, near Bucharest.

He received his Ph.D. in nuclear electronics, from Politehnica University in 1968. He received a second Ph.D. in theoretical physics from the Central Institute of Physics, Bucharest in 1980.

== Academic career ==
- 1958–1962 Electronic engineer, Institute of Atomic Physics (IFA) of the Romanian Academy, Măgurele, near Bucharest.
- 1962–1969 Senior electronic engineer, IFA, Măgurele.
- 1966–1968 Part-time assistant professor, Faculty of Electronics, Politehnica University of Bucharest (Seminars on Radio-Electronics).
- 1969–1977 Senior researcher of 3rd degree, IFA Măgurele.
- 1977–1990 Senior researcher of 3rd degree, Institute of Physics and Nuclear Engineering (IFIN - former IFA reorganized), Măgurele.
- 1981–1986 Part-time lecturer, Faculty of Physics, University of Bucharest (Nuclear structure and Nuclear Reactions).
- 1990–1996 Senior researcher of 1st degree, the highest position in research, equivalent with full professor at the university, IFIN, Măgurele.
- 1996–2000 Scientific director of IFIN-HH — the largest Romanian Institute of Research.
- Since 1996 Senior researcher of 1st degree, Horia Hulubei National Institute of Physics and Nuclear Engineering (IFIN-HH), the former IFIN reorganized. Also PhD supervisor (Associate Professor, Faculty of Physics, University of Bucharest), since 1990.

On June 30, 2017 he was elected honorary member of the Romanian Academy.

== Scientific leadership ==
Poenaru organized the International Symposium "Advances in Nuclear Physics" celebrating the 50th anniversary of IFIN-HH, held in Bucharest in 1999 and the NATO Advanced Study Institute on "Nuclei far from Stability and Astrophysics", Predeal, 2000.

He was named one of the most valued reviewers of 2010 by the editors of Elsevier and Nuclear Physics Other journals for which Poenaru peer reviewed articles include Physical Review Letters, Physical Review C, Journal of Physics G: Nuclear and Particle Physics and Canadian Journal of Physics. He was a member of the Scientific Council of the Joint Institute for Nuclear Research, Dubna, 1996–1997.

He was project manager of the FP5 European Union Centre of Excellence IDRANAP (InterDisciplinary Research and Applications based on Nuclear and Atomic Physics), selected in 2000 by the European Commission among 34 successful proposals out of 185 applications from 11 countries.

== Scientific achievements ==
Poenaru designed and built about 15 electronic instruments, including a counting-rate meter with industrial applications, a closed-circuit television system used at the cyclotron, a charge-sensitive low-noise amplifier and a precision pulse generator for a semiconductor detector spectrometer and a switching circuit for photomultiplier tubes.

He helped develop the theory of charge collection in semiconductor detectors and the formation of current or voltage pulses at the input of associated electronics. Poenaru produced experimental works on nuclear reactions (e.g., neutron evaporation spectra) and identification of new high-spin nuclear isomeric states. He experimented on fission isomers (e.g. excitation functions, excitation energies, isomeric yield, half-life measurements, angular correlations).

He created ASAF and Numerical SuperAsymmetric Fission (NuSAF) models used to show that alpha decay may be considered a cold fission process. He identified a new semi-empirical relationship (SemFIS) for half-life relative to alpha-decay based on fission theory, taking into account the shell effects.

He published the most frequently-cited paper in the field of cluster decay in 1980. The next one was published in 1985.

== Radioactivity ==
Starting in 1984, the following radioactivities were experimentally confirmed worldwide: ^{14}C, ^{20}O, ^{23}F, ^{22,24-26}Ne, ^{28,30}Mg, and ^{32,34}Si. The measured half-lives are in good agreement with theoretical predictions within the analytical superasymmetric fission (ASAF) model developed by Poenaru, W. Greiner, et al.

Citations of papers published by D. N. Poenaru et al. on heavy particle radioactivities started in 1984 after the first experimental confirmation by Rose and Jones of the ^{14}C radioactivity of 223Ra.

The phenomenon of heavy reactivity received wide popularity. The event was described by scientific journals, including La Recherche Nr. 159, Oct. 1984 p. 1300; Science et Vie Nr. 808, Jan. 1985 p. 42; Physics Bulletin Vol. 46 Nr. 489, 1985 p. 489, Scientific American Nr. 3, March 1990 p. 58 (translated into 9 languages), Europhysics News Nr. 5, Nr. 5, September/October 1996, p. 99 and by newspapers in Germany, Hungary, and Romania.

Many experimenters and theoreticians acknowledged D. N. Poenaru's contributions.

Poenaru continued to investigate actively the field. He published in many journals and books, gave invited talks at International Conferences and led international seminars. He and his coworkers published comprehensive tables of half-lives for cluster emission used by experimentalists and other theorist as a guide or a reference. His ASAF model provides a unified approach of cold fission, cluster decay and alpha decay.

The systematics of experimental results updated in 2002 was useful to stress that the strong shell effect of the daughter nucleus ^{208}Pb was not fully exploited, suggesting the need for new measurements. In 2006, the barrier shape of some cluster decay modes were obtained by using the macroscopic-microscopic method. An alpha emitter (^{106}Te) was discovered with a potential energy surface on which the alpha-decay valley may be seen by the same method.

An extensive study of alpha decay of superheavy nuclei was performed during the last decade, as a consequence of identifying new elements of the "island of stability". A new method to estimate the preformation probability as a penetrability of the internal part of the barrier within a fission theory was developed.

The simplest way to represent the systematics of half-lives for alpha-decay and heavy particle radioactivity is offered by the universal curve (UNIV), log T = f(log P) - a single straight line for a given even-even cluster decay mode, published in 1990. T is the half-life and P is the penetrability. The three fission models (ASAF, UNIV, and SemFIS) have been also applied to study the decay modes of superheavy nuclei produced in heavy ion fusion reactions at GSI Helmholtz Centre for Heavy Ion Research Darmstadt, Joint Institute for Nuclear Research Dubna, RIKEN Japan, and Lawrence Livermore National Laboratory, USA. For atomic numbers Z > 122, it is possible that cluster decay may be stronger than (i.e. have a larger branching ratio than) alpha decay.

He extended the binary fission theory to more complex phenomena such as ternary fission (particle-accompanied fission) and multicluster fission was predicted. Quaternary fission (two-alpha accompanied fission) was experimentally discovered by Goennenwein et al. Pyatkov and Kamanin et al. in JINR Dubna are pursuing experiments on collinear ternary fission. In 2005, when Alexandru Proca's death was commemorated, Poenaru used the opportunity to disseminate information about his relativistic equations of the massive vector boson field, as well as his life in Romania and in France.

Since 2007, the macroscopic-microscopic method was used to study the equilibrium shapes of metallic atomic clusters. Within these multidisciplinary investigations the hemispheroidal quantum harmonic oscillator, a new deformed single-particle shell model, was developed. The large yield of single ionized trimer (with two delocalized electrons, the analogue of an alpha particle) observed in experiments on doubly ionized metallic clusters was explained. Unlike in fission of heavy nuclei, in this case both the liquid drop model deformation energy and the shell corrections versus the number of delocalized electrons of the light fragment reach a minimum at the well known magic number ne=2. It was suggested to use this type of fission mode in nanotechnology.

== International collaboration ==
Since 1964, Poenaru collaborated with scientists from JINR Dubna, CRN Strasbourg, Institut de physique nucleaire d'Orsay, CENBG Bordeaux-Gradignan, Vanderbilt University (Nashville), Advanced Science Research Center of Japan Atomic Energy Research Institute Tokai, Institut fuer Theoretische Physik der J. W. Goethe Universitaet, Frankfurt am Main, GSI Helmholtz Centre for Heavy Ion Research Darmstadt, and Frankfurt Institute for Advanced Studies.

During 53 years of scientific activity he spent nearly 11 years abroad: 2 months in Ukraine; 3 months in Russia; 3 months in Japan; 4 months in USA; one year and 10 months in France, and 8 years in Germany.

== Publications ==
He published more than 189 articles in refereed journals (152 ISI), 123 communications at international scientific meetings (54 invited talks, 30 oral contributions and 39 seminar talks). The first two conferences at which cluster decay modes were discussed were Varna in 1985 and Kyoto 1988.

He was coauthor or co-editor of 12 books; five in Romania and seven in USA, Germany, England, the Netherlands and Singapore.

- Nuclei far from stability and astrophysics, Eds. D. N. Poenaru, H. Rebel, J. Wentz (Kluwer Academic, Dordrecht, 2001) ISBN 0-7923-6936-X.
- Advances in Nuclear Physics (Proceedings of the international symposium fifty years of institutional physics research in Romania), Eds. D. N. Poenaru, S. Stoica (World Scientific, Singapore, 2000) ISBN 981-02-4276-X.
- Experimental techniques in nuclear physics, Eds. D. N. Poenaru, W. Greiner (Walter de Gruyter, Berlin, 1997) ISBN 3-11-014467-0.
- Nuclear decay modes, Ed. D.N. Poenaru (Institute of Physics Publishing, Bristol, 1996) ISBN 0-7503-0338-7.
- Handbook of nuclear properties, Eds. D. N. Poenaru, W. Greiner (Clarendon Press, Oxford, 1996) ISBN 0-19-851779-3.
- Particle emission from nuclei. Vol. I: Nuclear Deformation Energy. Vol. II: Alpha, Proton and Heavy Ion Radioactivities. Vol. III: Fission and Beta-Delayed Decay Modes. Eds, D.N. Poenaru, M.S. Ivascu (CRC Press, Boca Raton, 1989) ISBN 0-8493-4634-7, 0-8943-4635-5, 0-8943-4636-3.
- Deformation Energy and Nuclear Shape Isomers (in Romanian), Eds. M. Ivascu, D.N. Poenaru (Editura Academiei, Bucharest, 1981).
- D.N. Poenaru, Semiconductor Radiation Detector Waveforms (in Romanian), (Editura Academiei, Bucharest, 1968).
- D.N. Poenaru, N. Vîlcov, Measurement of Nuclear Radiation with Semiconductor Devices (in Romanian), (Editura Academiei, Bucharest, 1967).

== Honors and awards ==
He was mentioned with A. Săndulescu and W. Greiner in the New Encyclopædia Britannica for calculations, published in 1980, indicating the possibility of a new type of decay of nuclei: heavy particle radioactivity. In this way he became the 4th Romanian scientist mentioned in Encyclopædia Britannica, after Nicolae Paulescu, Henri Coandă, and Aureliu Săndulescu. In 1980 Sandulescu, Poenaru, and Greiner described calculations indicating the possibility of a new type of decay of heavy nuclei intermediate between alpha decay and spontaneous fission. The first observation of heavy-ion radioactivity was that of a 30-MeV, carbon-14 emission from radium-223 by H.J. Rose and G.A. Jones in 1984. (https://www.britannica.com/science/radioactivity#ref496381)

He was awarded the Deutsche Forschungsgemeinschaft (DFG) MERCATOR Gastprofessur position at the Frankfurt Institute for Advanced Studies, Goethe University Frankfurt in 2009. It is the highest award granted by the DFG each year.

In 2009 the Emanuil Gojdu National College in Oradea, Romania, celebrated its 90th anniversary. The professional activity of some of the former students of this high school, including Prof. Poenaru, is presented in a small museum called the "Golden Book". The Laboratory of Physics bears his name.

A special issue of the Romanian Reports in Physics (Vol. 59 (2007), nr.2) is devoted to Prof. Poenaru's 70th Anniversary, with worldwide contributions.

- IFIN-HH "Horia Hulubei" Diploma of Honour for the outstanding contributions (life achievements), 2007.
- IFIN-HH Diploma of Merit for the excellent activity in 2005.
- Adjoint Professor at Vanderbilt University in Nashville, Tennessee, one month in 1998, 1999, 2000, and 2002.
- Grant of the Japan Society for the Promotion of Science to work at the Advanced Science Research Center of JAERI Tokai, Ibaraki 2000.
- Bourse Haut Niveau granted by the Ministry of National Education (France), Paris, 1994.
- Scientific Creativity Award for prediction of cluster decay modes, Journal Flacăra Bucharest, 1988.
- Romanian Academy of Sciences Dragomir Hurmuzescu award, for the research on fissioning nuclear isomers, 1977.
