= Anasagasti =

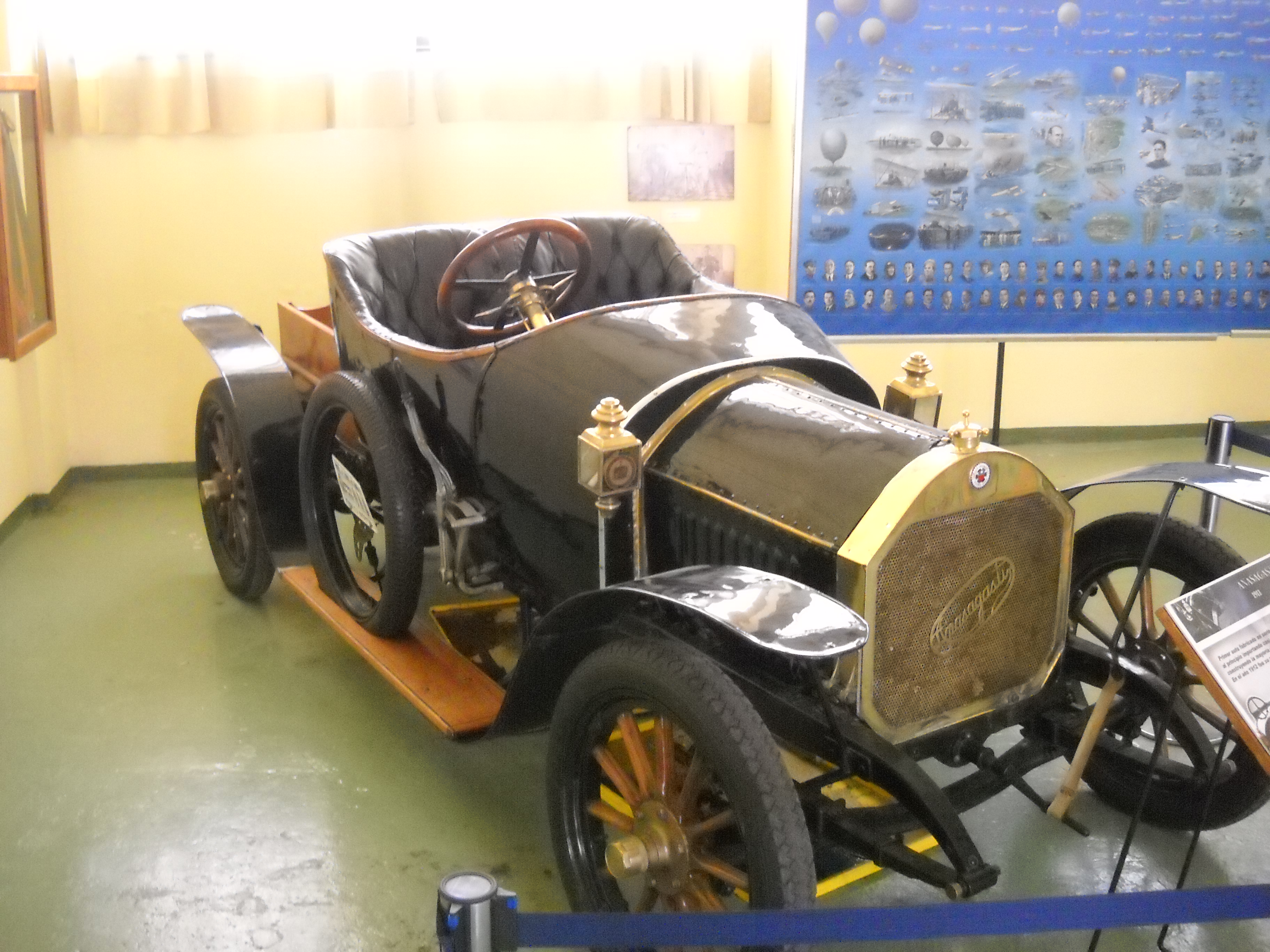
- Anasagasti, 1914, preserved and exhibited at the National Aeronautics Museum, 2011

Overview
- Model years: 1912–14
- Designer: Horacio Anasagasti

The Anasagasti was the first automobile to be built in Argentina; it was manufactured by Horacio Anasagasti of Buenos Aires from 1912 to 1914.

anasagasti model 50 1911-1914

== History ==
Horacio Anasagasti was a student of Argentine engineer Otto Krause. Shortly after creating his own workshop, he founded the Anasagasti company in 1909, where he repaired automobile, aviation and agricultural engines. In 1910, he presented his first prototype at the Exposición Internacional de Ferrocarriles y Transportes Terrestres (International Exhibition of Railways and Land Transportation) an Inline-4 engine and a 4-speed gearbox and recoil, which won the Grand Prize Diploma of the exhibition.

After a trip to Europe to find suppliers in 1911, he finally created his first vehicle, a 15 horsepower (11 kW) Ballot-engined car, with a French engine and Argentine body, being presented on September 17 in the Rosario-Córdoba-Rosario race. It began selling in 1912 for $ 6500. The first versions were equipped with the French engine of 2125 cm3 and were offered with double phaeton bodies and a single door on the left side.

In 1912-13 he entered cars built to his design in Europe. He sent three cars to Europe to participate in different races: a team of the cars competed in the 1912 Tour de France Automobile, while a lone Picker-engined racer was entered in the 1913 Coupe de l'Auto. The "Anasagasti" was the winner of the 1515 km Paris-Madrid race.

Anasagasti then returned home to Argentina, where he is believed to have built about 50 touring models. With the outbreak of World War I it was very difficult to get supplies and the company closed in 1915. After the closure of Anasagasti & Cia, there were approximately 50 units, most of which continued to work as taxis in Buenos Aires.

== Survivors ==
An example of a 1914 Anasagasti car, previously used by the Argentine Air Force, is preserved at the Museo Nacional de Aeronáutica de Argentina, located in Morón, Buenos Aires. This vehicle was personally donated by Anasagasti to his friend Engineer Jorge Newbery on September 8, 1912. Newbery used it to transport mail to the Aeroparque.Another one is held and used by the "Club de Automóviles Clásicos de la República Argentina" CAC.
