= Horacio Anasagasti =

Argentinian engineer

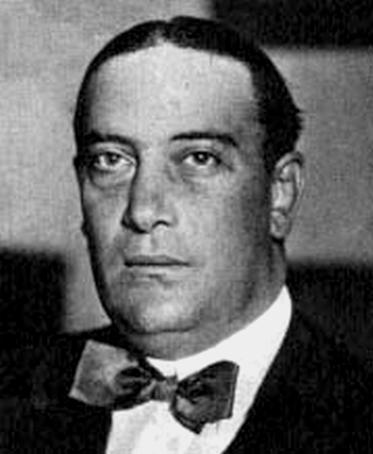
- Born: July 16, 1879; Bariloche, Rio Negro, Argentina
- Died: April 8, 1932 (aged 52); Buenos Aires
- Resting place: La Recoleta Graveyard

Horacio Anasagasti (July 16, 1879 – April 8, 1932) was an Argentinean engineer, manufacturer of the first Argentine car, the “Anasagasti”, that ran on the Tour de France (1912) and won the Madrid-Paris 1515 km Race in 1913.

== Early life ==
His family, of Basque origin, was a wealthy family that was part of the growing Argentine bourgeoisie and aristocracy. Horacio Anasagasti was a car lover and followed the news of the automotive industry from an early age. At 23, he graduated as engineer at the University of Buenos Aires and was a student of the prominent Argentine engineer Otto Krause. He won an academic award and was able to travel to Milan, where he attended a course at the Isotta Fraschini company, returning to Argentina with a car of that brand. In 1907, the Touring Club Argentino was founded and he was part of the first Board of Directors as vice president.

== Anasagasti & Cia ==
On December 30, 1909 he created his own company, Anasagasti y Cía, located on Avenida Alvear in Buenos Aires (near Avenida del Libertador). The company was a precision mechanical workshop that offered repair and sale of car engines, airplanes and agricultural vehicles. The engineer Antonio Bianchi wrote an article for the newspaper La Prensa where he told the story of Anasagasti y Cía.

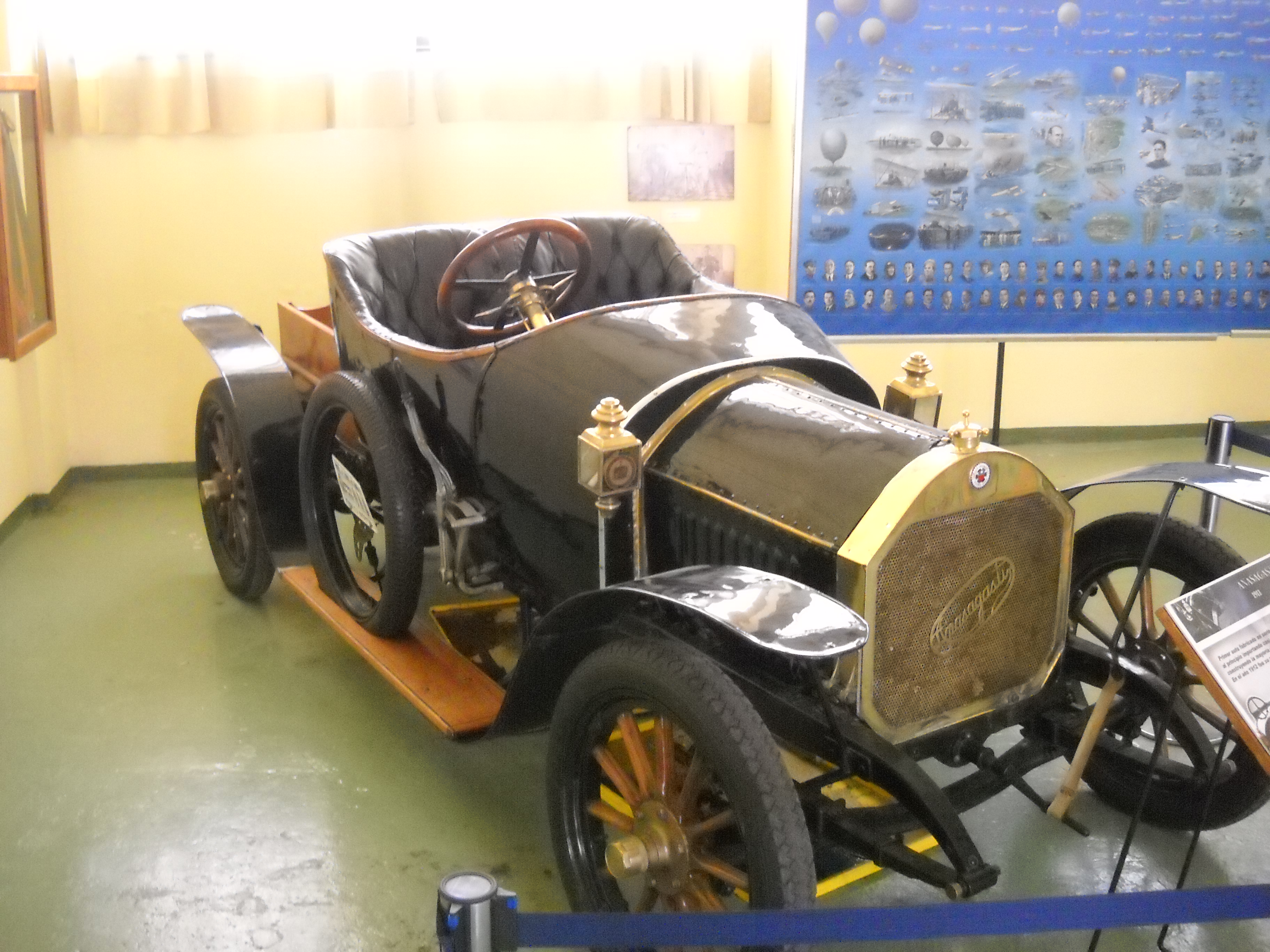
Anasagasti automobile in Museo Nacional de Aeronáutica de Argentina.

In 1910, he presented his first prototype at the Exposición Internacional de Ferrocarriles y Transportes Terrestres (International Exhibition of Railways and Land Transportation): a 4-cylinder in-line engine and a 4-speed gearbox and recoil, and won the Grand Prize Diploma of the exhibition. That same year, he traveled to France and bought engines and molds from the Ballot brothers, which he used to begin manufacturing bloks, crankcases, crankshafts, speed boxes, differentials, suspensions and bodies. In 1911 the company already manufactured cylinders, shaft tip and cardans.

He took part in the Rosario-Cordoba-Rosario Race (1911) driving his first vehicle and won the race.

At 1912 the company produced two models: Doble Phaeton and Landaulet, which sold for $6500. The first versions were armed with the French engine of 2125 cm3 and were offered with double phaeton bodies and a single door on the left side.

As Horacio Anasagasti was a great car racing enthusiast, three Anasagasti cars were shipped to Europe and took part in different competitions. Each car had 15 HP engines and participated in the Tour de France, driven by Engineer Brown, Marquis D'Avary and M. Repousseau.

In 1915 due to World War I, the financing system fell due to lack of payments and Anasagasti's workers proposed to continue working without collecting salaries. Anasagasti was influenced by the new social theories of the early twentieth century; his factory was the first in the country with the 8-hour work day, the company's salaries were among the highest in the Argentine industry. In 1915, decided to close its workshops. At the close of Anasagasti & Cia there were approximately 50 cars, most of them continued driving along Buenos Aires as taxis.

== Death ==
Horacio Anasagasti died of a cardiac arrest on April 8, 1932. The city of Buenos Aires honored him with a street in the Palermo neighborhood.
