= Eric Pop =

Romanian-born American engineer and academic

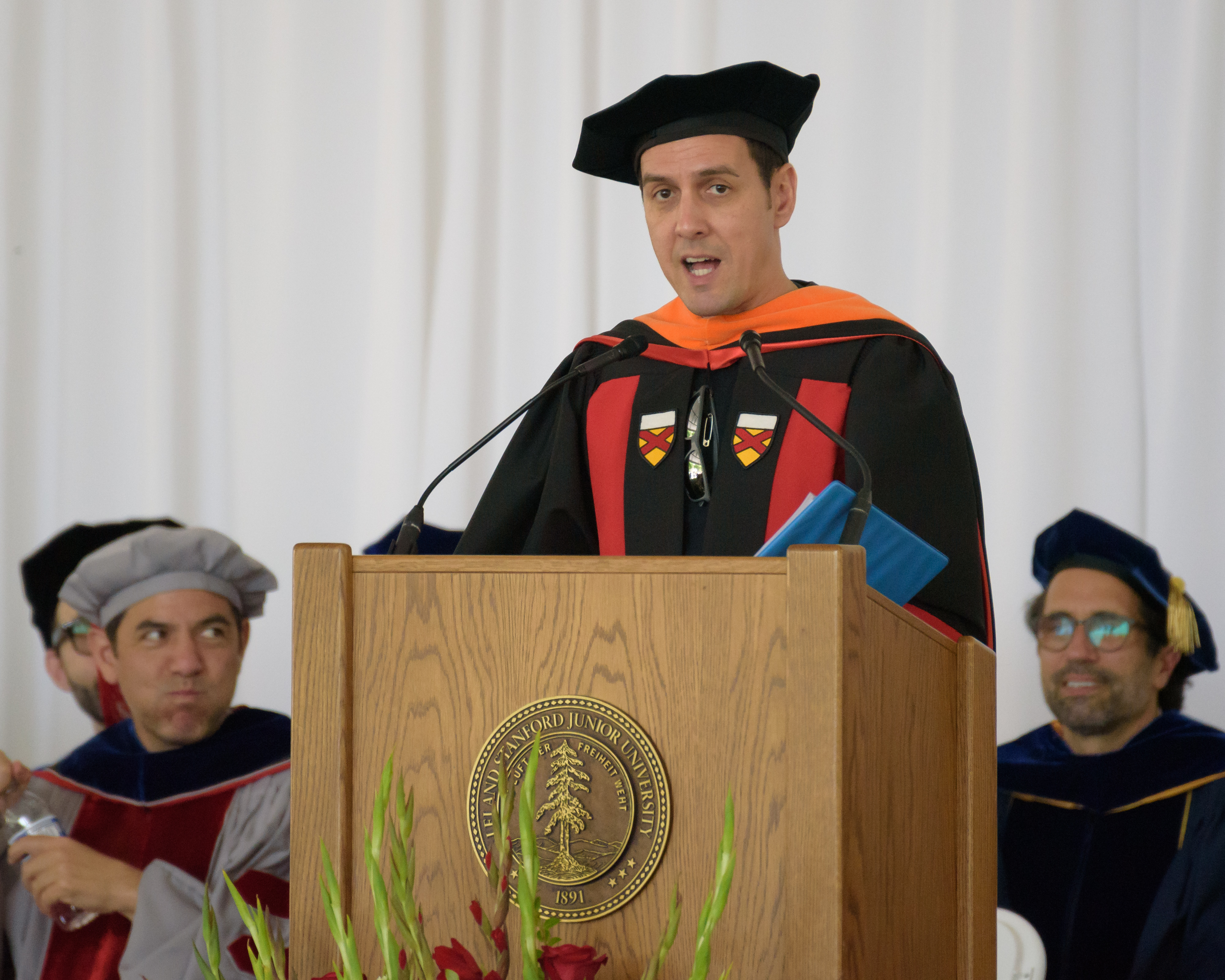
- Education: Massachusetts Institute of Technology (BS, BS, MEng); Stanford University (PhD)
- Scientific career
- Fields: Engineering
- Thesis: Self-heating and scaling of thin body transistors (2004)
- Doctoral advisor: Kenneth E. Goodson; Robert W. Dutton
- Website: profiles.stanford.edu/epop (profile); poplab.stanford.edu (research)

Eric Pop is a Romanian-born American engineer and academic at Stanford University, where he serves as Pease-Ye Professor in the School of Engineering. Pop is a professor of electrical engineering, and, by courtesy, of applied physics and materials science and engineering at Stanford, and his research includes work on carbon nanotubes, phase-change memory, and nanotechnology. In 2010, he received the Presidential Early Career Award for Scientists and Engineers. Pop is a fellow of both the American Physical Society and Institute of Electrical and Electronics Engineers, is recognized as a Highly Cited Researcher, and has an entry in the 36th, 37th, and 38th editions of American Men and Women of Science. (Note: Gale CX3677249034, CX7734147614, CX8010258624.)

== Early life and education ==
Pop grew up in Romania, speaking both Romanian and Hungarian. He attended Emanuil Gojdu High School in Oradea, and competed in physics olympiads. After moving to the United States at the age of 17, he attended Santa Monica High School for 11th and 12th grades.

In 1999, he completed three degrees from Massachusetts Institute of Technology (MIT): two Bachelor of Science degrees, one in physics, another in electrical engineering, and a Master of Engineering, also in electrical engineering. At MIT, he was a member of the Romanian Student Association. Pop continued his education by pursuing a doctorate at Stanford University. In 2004, he defended his dissertation, and in 2005 he received his Ph.D. in electrical engineering. He continued as a postdoctoral researcher under Hongjie Dai in Stanford's chemistry department.

== Career ==
Immediately after his postdoctoral research, he joined Intel as a senior engineer, where he worked from 2005 to 2007. From 2007 to 2015, Pop was faculty at the University of Illinois at Urbana-Champaign (UIUC). (Note: From 2013 to 2015, Pop's position was as an adjunct professor.) He joined the faculty of Stanford's electrical engineering department in 2013. Pop noted that the transition to a new institution was a slow process—he had to wait for his grants to be transferred over. He has had a successful career at Stanford, where he is the inaugural Pease-Ye Professor, a position named for its endowers, Jun Ye and Caren Wang, and for Pop's relationship with R. Fabian Pease. He was appointed to the professorship in 2023.

== Research ==
Pop's research combines the fields of electronics, nanomaterials, and energy. He is the leader of the Pop Lab research group, and also holds an appointment in SystemX. He has also been awarded multiple patents in affiliation with both UIUC and Stanford.
