= Cold fission =

Fission events that generate no neutrons or gamma rays

Cold fission or cold nuclear fission is defined as involving fission events for which fission fragments have such low excitation energy that no neutrons or gammas are emitted.

Cold fission events have so low a probability of occurrence that it is necessary to use a high-flux nuclear reactor to study them.

According to research first published in 1981, the first observation of cold fission events was in experiments on fission induced by thermal neutrons of uranium-233, uranium-235, and plutonium-239 using the high-flux reactor at the Institut Laue-Langevin in Grenoble, France. Other experiments on cold fission were also done involving curium 248 and californium 252. A unified approach of cluster decay, alpha decay and cold fission was developed by Dorin N. Poenaru et al. A phenomenological interpretation was proposed by Gönnenwein and Duarte et al.

The importance of cold fission phenomena lies in the fact that fragments reaching detectors have the same mass that they obtained at the "scission" configuration, just before the attractive but short-range nuclear force becomes null, and only Coulomb interaction acts between fragments. After this, Coulomb potential energy is converted into fragments of kinetic energies, which—added to pre-scission kinetic energies—is measured by detectors.

The fact that cold fission preserves nuclear mass until the fission fragments reach the detectors permits the experimenter to better determine the fission dynamics, especially the aspects related to Coulomb and shell effects in low energy fission and nucleon pair breaking. Adopting several theoretical assumptions about scission configuration one can calculate the maximal value of kinetic energy as a function of charge and mass of fragments and compare them to experimental results.

== See also ==
- Cold fusion
