= Karlsruhe Nuclide Chart =

The Karlsruhe Nuclide Chart (German: Karlsruher Nuklidkarte) is a widespread table of nuclides in print.

== Characteristics ==
It is a two-dimensional graphical representation in the Segrè-arrangement with the neutron number N on the abscissa and the proton number Z on the ordinate. Each nuclide is represented at the intersection of its respective neutron and proton number by a small square box with the chemical symbol and the nucleon number A. By columnar subdivision of such a field, in addition to ground states also nuclear isomers can be shown. The coloring of a field (segmented if necessary) shows in addition to the existing text entries the observed types of radioactive decay of the nuclide and a rough classification of their relative shares: stable, nonradioactive nuclides completely black, primordial radionuclides partially black, proton emission orange, alpha decay yellow, beta plus decay/electron capture red, isomeric transition (gamma decay, internal conversion) white, beta minus decay blue, spontaneous fission green, cluster emission violet, neutron emission light blue. For each radionuclide its field includes (if known) information about its half-life and essential energies of the emitted radiation, for stable nuclides and primordial radionuclides there are data on mole fraction abundances in the natural isotope mixture of the corresponding chemical element. Furthermore, for many nuclides cross sections for nuclear reactions with thermal neutrons are quoted, usually for the (n, γ)-reaction (neutron capture), partly fission cross sections for the induced nuclear fission and cross sections for the (n, α)-reaction or (n, p)-reaction. For the chemical elements cross sections and standard atomic weights (both averaged over natural isotopic composition) are specified (the relative atomic masses partially as an interval to reflect the variability of the composition of the element's natural isotope mixture). For the nuclear fission of ^{235}U and ^{239}Pu with thermal neutrons, percentage isobaric chain yields of fission products are listed.

== History, editions ==
The first printed edition of the Karlsruhe Nuclide Chart of 1958 in the form of a wall chart was created by Walter Seelmann-Eggebert and his assistant Gerda Pfennig. Walter Seelmann-Eggebert was director of the Radiochemistry Institute in the 1956 founded Kernreaktor Bau- und Betriebsgesellschaft mbH ('Nuclear Reactor Construction and Operating Company Ltd.') in Karlsruhe, Germany (a predecessor institution of the later (Kern-)Forschungszentrum Karlsruhe, 'Karlsruhe (Nuclear) Research Center,' nowadays Karlsruhe Institute of Technology) and appointed professor of radiochemistry at the Karlsruhe Technical University. Radiochemical isotope courses were held at the institute, and in the context of these teaching courses the Karlsruhe Nuclide Chart arose, which was intended to be a well-structured overview of the essential properties of the nuclides already known at that time.

In the following decades, the Karlsruhe Nuclide Chart was published and revised several times. In addition to other co-authors, Seelmann-Eggebert (d. 1988) was involved up to the 5th edition in 1981, Pfennig (d. 2017) up to the 9th edition in 2015. In 2006, the management of the Karlsruhe Nuclide Chart changed over from Forschungszentrum Karlsruhe to the Institute for Transuranium Elements (ITU) of the Joint Research Centre (JRC) of the European Commission (EC), then in 2012 to Nucleonica GmbH, a spin-off company of the JRC-ITU.

The following summary table regarding the individual editions of the Karlsruhe Nuclide Chart also expresses the scientific progress in the field of discovery/exploration of the nuclides and new chemical elements.

edition	year	number of included chemical elements	number of included nuclides		
edition	year	number of included chemical elements	total	ground states	nuclear isomers
1.	1958	102	1517	ca. 1300	ca. 220
2.	1961	103	1587	?	?
3.	1968	105	1837	ca. 1600?	?
4.	1974	105?	2137	ca. 1900?	?
5.	1981	107	2224	2224?	?
6.	1995; 1998 (rev. 1); 2001 (rev. 2)	111; 112 ?	2684; 3361? ?	ca. 2690? ? ?	? ? ?
7.	2006; 2007 (rev. 1)	117 ?	3658 ?	2965 ?	693 ?
8.	2012	118	3846	3126	720
9.	2015	118	3993	3248	745
10.	2018	118	4040	3285	755
11.	2022	118	4122	3354	768
12.	2025	118	4190	?	?

? = Sources incongruent or explicit/implicit numerical data missing or inclusion of nuclear isomers in figures unclear.

== Versions ==
The Karlsruhe Nuclide Chart is primarily published as a fold-out chart (size A4) or as a wall chart (size 0.96 m × 1.40 m). There are also larger sizes (roll map, auditorium chart and "carpet"). Since 2014, an internet-based version "Karlsruhe Nuclide Chart Online (KNCO)" with regular updates is offered via the Nucleonica nuclear science internet portal. To support nuclear education, a simplified school version, the KNClight has been developed.

The largest known version of the Karlsruhe Nuclide Chart is located in the Reactor Institute Delft, being 13 m × 19 m in size.
