= Nucleon pair breaking in fission =

Nucleon pair breaking in fission has been an important topic in nuclear physics for decades. "Nucleon pair" refers to nucleon pairing effects which strongly influence the nuclear properties of a nuclide.

The most measured quantities in research on nuclear fission are the charge and mass fragments yields for uranium-235 and other fissile nuclides. In this sense, experimental results on charge distribution for low-energy fission of actinides present a preference to an even Z fragment, which is called odd-even effect on charge yield.

The importance of these distributions is because they are the result of rearrangement of nucleons on the fission process due to the interplay between collective variables and individual particle levels; therefore they permit to understand several aspects of dynamics of fission process. The process from saddle (when nucleus begins its irreversible evolution to fragmentation) to scission point (when fragments are formed and nuclear interaction between fragments dispels), fissioning system shape changes but also promote nucleons to excited particle levels.

Because, for even Z (proton number) and even N (neutron number) nuclei, there is a gap from ground state to first excited particle state—which is reached by nucleon pair breaking—fragments with even Z is expected to have a higher probability to be produced than those with odd Z.

The preference even Z even N divisions is interpreted as the preservation of superfluidity during the descent from saddle to scission. The absence of odd-even effect means that process is rather viscous.

Contrary to observed for charge distributions no odd-even effect on fragments mass number (A) is observed. This result is interpreted by the hypothesis that in fission process always there will be nucleon pair breaking, which may be proton pair or neutron pair breaking in low energy fission of uranium-234, uranium-236, and plutonium-240 studied by Modesto Montoya.
