= Otto Krause Technical School =

Coordinates: 34°36′55″S 58°22′07″W

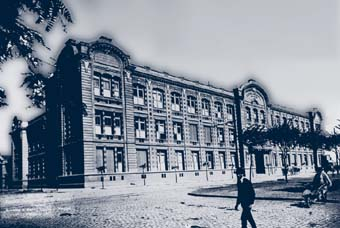
- Former names: National Industrial School
- Type: Technical School
- Established: March 17, 1899; 127 years ago
- Location: Buenos Aires, Argentina
- Colors: Red, White
- Website: www.ottokrause.edu.ar

The Escuela Técnica Otto Krause is a degree grating educational institution located at the intersection of Paseo Colón Avenue and Chile Street, in the San Telmo section of Buenos Aires, Argentina. Named after its founder, the engineer Otto Krause, son of German immigrants, the school was founded in 1897 and is the oldest technological school in the country.

The school currently has around 2000 students and operates a six-year programme. The first three years (ciclo básico) provide a technical high-school programme for students who have completed their elementary education. Years four to six (ciclo superior) provide the equivalent of a technical college education in various branches of engineering technology. On completion of their studies here students may go on to university to follow a six-year programme leading to a degree in engineering.

The present school building, which was inaugurated on May 24, 1909, was declared a National Monument in 1995.

== Notable alumni ==
- Gregorio Baro, scientist
- Alejandro Bustillo, architect
- Francisco Salamone, architect
- Oscar Panno, chessmaster
- Ladislao Pazmany, aviation designer
