= Gregorio Baró =

Argentine chemist (1928–2012)

Gregorio Baro
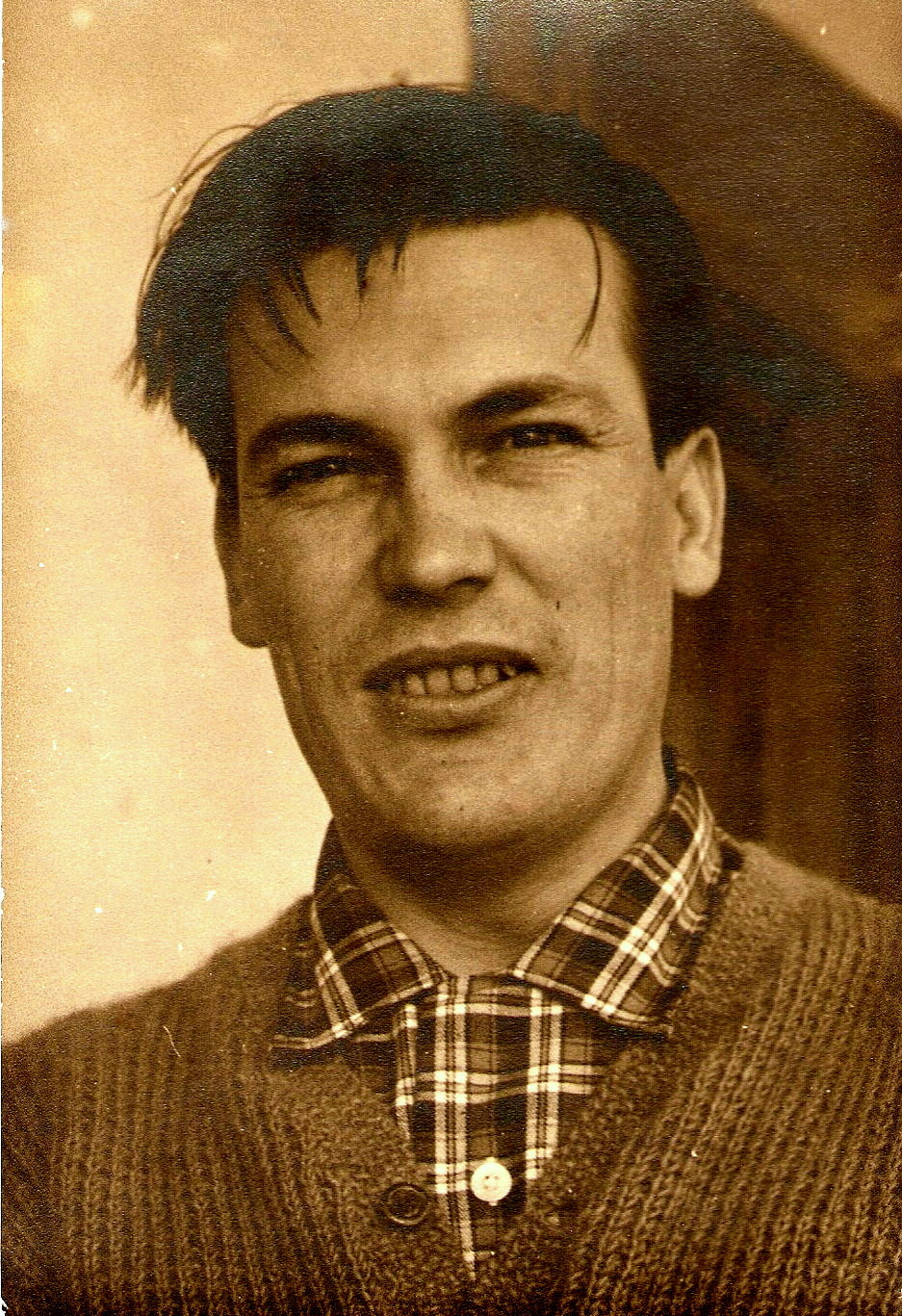
- Born: June 19, 1928; Santiago Temple, Córdoba Province, Argentina
- Died: May 28, 2012 (aged 83); Buenos Aires, Argentina
- Education: Universidad de Buenos Aires
- Known for: Discovery of new radioisotopes of ruthenium, rhodium, rhenium, tungsten, and osmium, and the development of an MRI contrast agent
- Scientific career
- Fields: Radiochemistry, nuclear chemistry
- Workplaces: National Atomic Energy Commission
- Doctoral advisor: Adrian Aten, Instituut voor Kernphysisch Onderzoek (Amsterdam)
- Other academic advisors: Walter Seelmann-Eggebert, Karlsruhe Institute of Technology

Gregorio Baró (June 19, 1928 - May 28, 2012) was an Argentine scientist. He was born in Santiago Temple, Córdoba and died in Buenos Aires.

== Biography ==
The son of Spanish immigrants from Cabreros del Río in the Province of León, Baró married the writer María Dhialma Tiberti. He completed his Associate of Science in Chemistry degree at the Otto Krause Technical School in Buenos Aires, in 1945. Afterward, he pursued his studies at Universidad de Buenos Aires from which he obtained a Bachelor of Science, followed by a PhD in Chemistry in 1961 at the Instituut voor Kernphysisch Onderzoek, in Amsterdam. In 1968, he conducted research on the production of radioisotopes in Bombay, India, organized by the International Atomic Energy Agency.

Baró was additionally a professor at several universities, such as Universidad de Buenos Aires, Universidad Nacional de La Plata, Universidad Nacional de Cuyo, Universidad Nacional de Rosario, and Universidad Nacional del Litoral. He was named Emeritus Researcher of the National Atomic Energy Commission in 2010, following 40 years of institutional work and reaching the rank of Director. He was also awararded a Doctor honoris causa in Radiochemistry from Higher University of San Andres, Bolivia, notably for his work in discovering new isotopes of ruthenium, rhodium, rhenium, tungsten, and osmium, and for the development of a contrast agent for Magnetic Resonance Imaging during retirement.

He was the Argentinian representative of the International Union of Pure and Applied Chemistry (IUPAC) for several years. In addition, he served as consultant for the Comisión de Energía Atómica de Bolivia, the Comisión Chilena de Energía Nuclear, the Instituto de Asuntos Nucleares de Colombia, the International Atomic Energy Agency in Asunción, Paraguay, the Centro Atómico del Perú, and the government of Uruguay.
