= Excitation function =

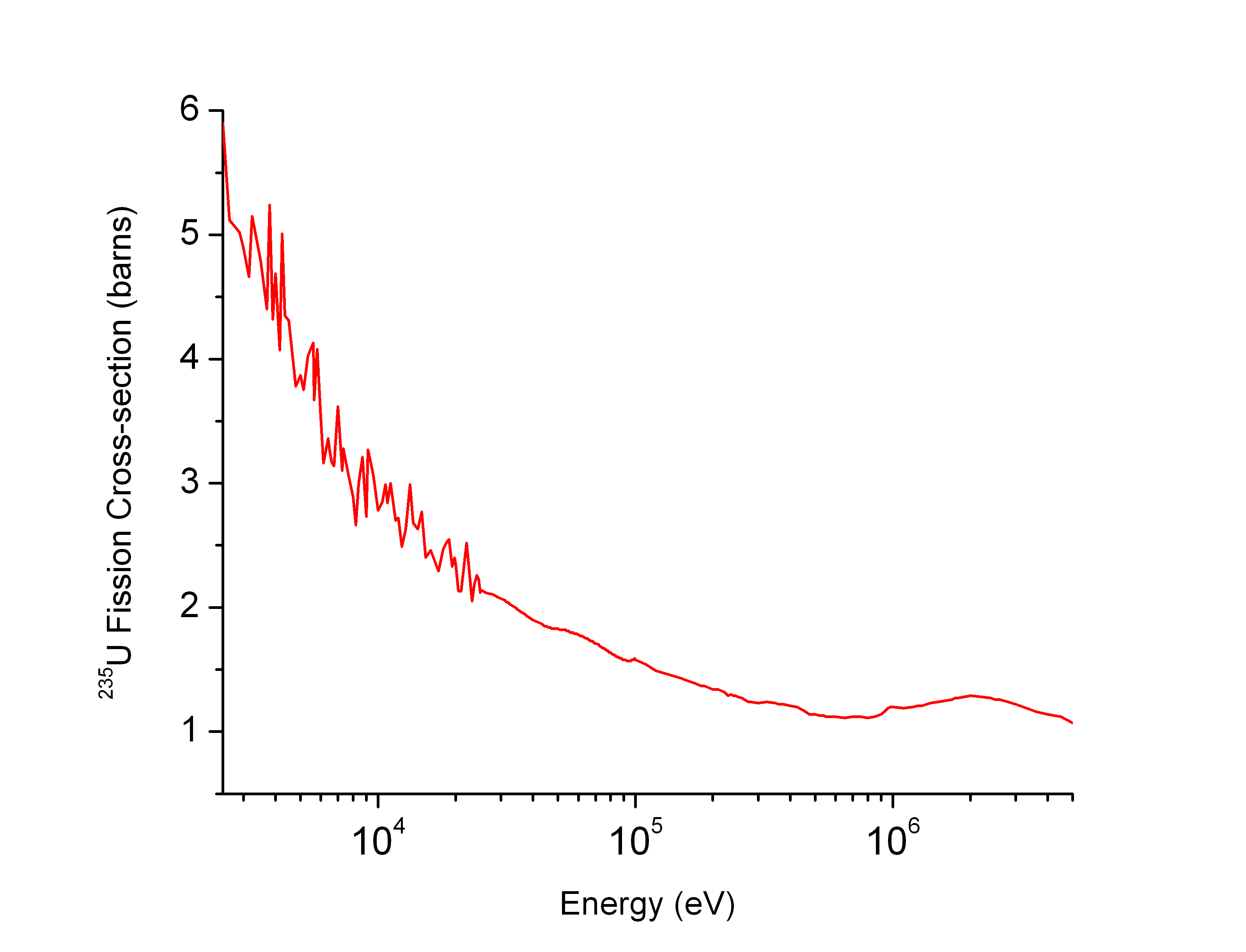
Uranium-235 tends to capture neutrons because of multiple resonances

Excitation function (a.k.a. yield curve) is a term used in nuclear physics to describe a graphical plot of the yield of a radionuclide or reaction channel as a function of the bombarding projectile energy or the calculated excitation energy of the compound nucleus. The yield is the measured intensity of a particular transition.

The excitation function typically resembles a Gaussian bell curve and is mathematically described by a Breit–Wigner function, owing to the resonant nature of the production of the compound nucleus. The energy value at the maximum yield on the excitation curve corresponds to the energy of the resonance. The energy interval between 25% and 75% of the maximum yield on the excitation curve are equivalent to the resonance width.

A nuclear reaction should be described by a complete study of the exit channel (1n,2n,3n etc.) excitation functions in order to allow a determination of the optimum energy to be used to maximize the yield.

== See also ==
- Resonant reaction
