= Walter Seelmann-Eggebert =

German radiochemist (1915–1988)

- Born: April 17, 1915; Kreis Teltow, Province of Brandenburg, Kingdom of Prussia, German Empire
- Died: July 19, 1988 (aged 73); Karlsruhe, Baden-Württemberg, Germany
- Education: Kaiser Wilhelm Institute
- Known for: Discovery of radioactive elements
- Scientific career
- Fields: Radiochemistry, nuclear chemistry
- Workplaces: Karlsruhe Institute of Technology
- Doctoral advisor: Otto Hahn
- Doctoral students: Gregorio Baro

Walter Seelmann-Eggebert (17 April 1915 – 19 July 1988) was a German radiochemist. He was son of Erich Eggebert and Edwig Schmidt.

He was a student of Otto Hahn at the Kaiser Wilhelm Institute for Chemistry, where, after 1939, he worked with Fritz Strassmann on nuclear fission.

In 1949, he joined the University of Tucuman in Argentina as a professor of chemistry. Later he created the radiochemistry group at the Buenos Aires University and at the National Atomic Energy Commission, working together with other notable pioneers of radiochemistry, such as Sara Abecasis, Gregorio Baro, Juan Flegenheimer, Jaime Pahissa-Campá, María Cristina Palcos, Enzo Ricci, Renato Radicella, Plinio Rey, Josefina Rodríguez, and Maela Viirsoo, just to mention a few. During his Argentinian years his group discovered 20 new nuclides.

In 1955, Otto Hahn invited him to come back to Germany for the reconstruction of radiochemistry studies in the country. He became professor in Mainz before creating and managing the Radiochemistry Institute from the Karlsruhe Kernforschungszentrum, now the Karlsruhe Institute of Technology (KIT). In 1958, together with Gerda Pfennig, he edited the first "Karlsruher Nuklidkarte" which has become a basic element both for nuclear scientists and education.
