= Nina Király =

Doctor Nina Király
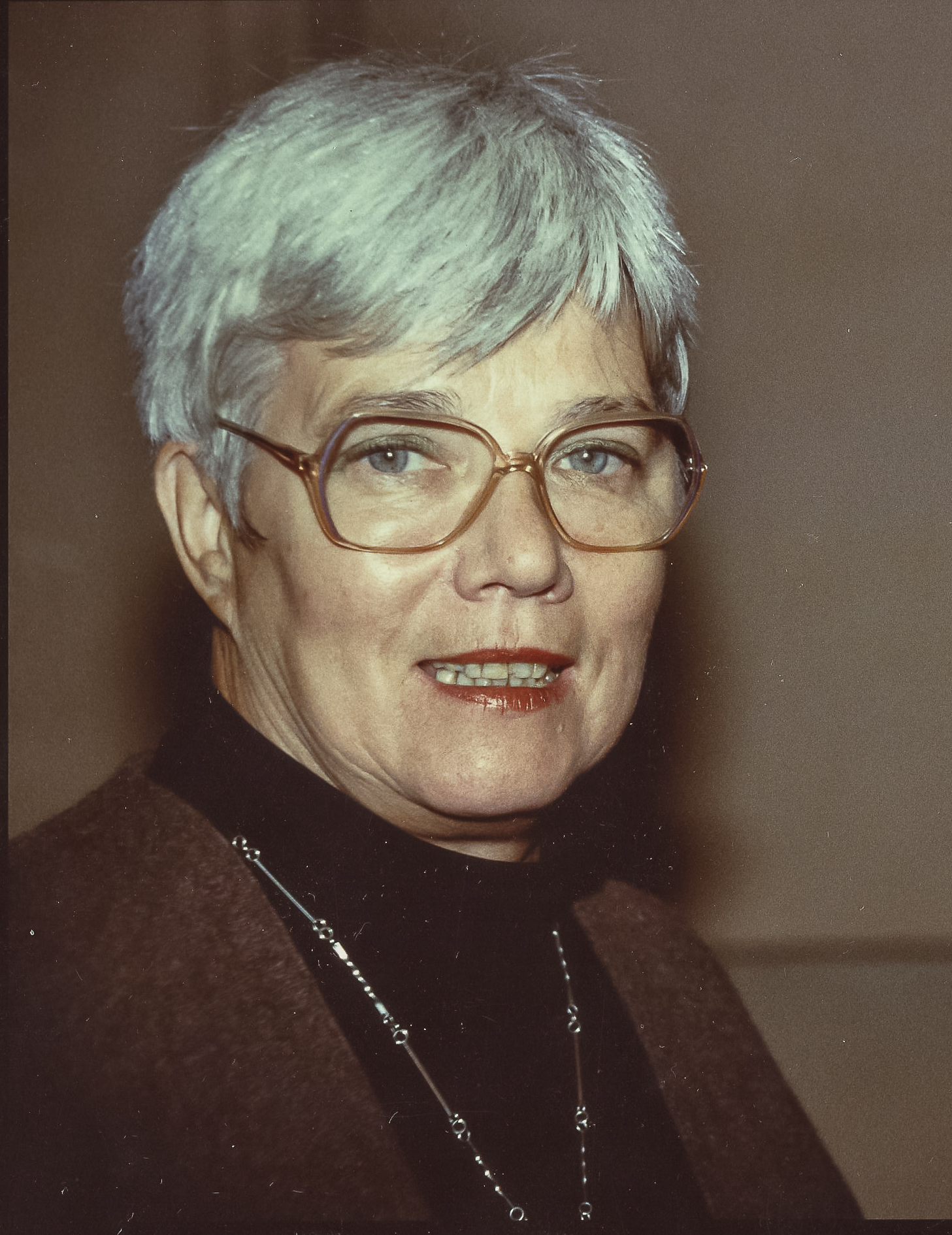
- Nina Király
- Born: Nina Petrovna Dubrovskaya; October 17, 1940; Moscow, Russia
- Died: June 9, 2018; Budapest, Hungary
- Education: Ph.D. (1973) at the Hungarian Academy of Sciences: Polish National Theater in the 18th Century (400 pages)
- Alma mater: Lomonosov University, Moscow
- Known for: Writings on contemporary Polish theater
- Notable work: Halálszínház (Writings by Tadeusz Kantor)
- Spouse: Gyula Király
- Awards: Jászai Mari Award (2012)
- Website: www.kiralyfoundation.hu/kiraly-nina

Nina Király (1940–2018) was a Mari Jászai award-winning theater historian, dramaturg, an expert on Polish and Eastern-European theater, who lived and worked in Budapest, Hungary. From 1993 to 1999 she was the Director of The Hungarian Theatre Museum and Institute and later became the advisor on international theaters and festivals for the Hungarian National Theater and the co-creator of the International MITEM festival. During her years as the Director of the Hungarian Theater Institute she published many theater books that were previously not translated or available for the Hungarian public, introducing the works of such international luminaries as Jan Kott, Anatoly Vasiliev, Eugenio Barba, Tadeusz Kantor. She spoke 4 languages.

== Career ==
Born in 1940 in Moscow. In 1962, she graduated from the local Moscow State University, majoring in linguistics and anthropology, and from that year worked at the Russian Academy of Sciences. In 1964 she moved to Budapest with her husband. Between 1964 and 1994 she worked at the Department of Slavic Studies at the Faculty of Humanities of the Eötvös Loránd University, first as a teaching assistant and then as an associate professor. In 1973 she received her Ph.D. Between 1984 and 1990 she was a lecturer in theater theory and history at Jagiellonian University in Kraków. Between 1993 and 1999 he was director of the National Theater History Museum and Institution. Between 1999 and 2003 she worked as a freelance critic and art consultant. Between 2003 and 2004 she was a member of the New Theater in charge of international affairs. Between 2004 and 2005, editor of the Pamietnik Teatralny magazine in Warsaw. Between 2005 and 2013 she worked at the Csokonai Theater in Debrecen. Between 2013 and 2018 she was a member of the National Theater. Her husband, Gyula Király, was a literary historian.

== Awards ==
- 1975- L'Ordre du "Merite Culturel" (Ministry of Culture, Poland)
- 2005 - Witkacy Award (Polish ITI)
- 2012- Jászai Mari Award

== Publications ==
A full list of publications can be found on www.kiralyfoundation.hu/kiraly-nina

- Article on Emigration by Nina from the 1991/3 edition of the "Culture and Society" periodical. In Hungarian. On the cover artwork by Erik Bulatov.
- A felvilágosodás kori lengyel színház problémái- Filológia közlöny, 1968 (188–197)
- Проблемы польского театра Просвещения- MTA Acta Litteraria, 1968
- A tizennyolcadik század Ju. Lotman felfogásában-Helikon, 1973 (546–552)
- От дидактической повести к роману- 1971 MTA Acta Litteraria (259–269)
- In memoriam Tadeusz Kantor. “Kultúra és közösség”. /Special periodical number on Avantgarde Theatre/, 1990/4. – /Edited and partly translated./
- Krakkói Ulysses. /Ulysses from Krakow/, Színház, 1990, május
- Mrozek-olvasatok- Jerzy Jarocki rendezéseiről, Színház, 1990, augusztus
- A nemkövetkezetesség és a nemtiszta forma színháza. /Tadeusz Różewicz művészete/.-Tadeusz Rózewicz: a non-pure and non-consequence Theatre. – Színház,1991, szeptember.
- Zarándok és ellenálló./Pilgrim and Contestator/. Special issue on Central and east-European Emigration. Ed. and translated. –“Kultúra és közösség”, 1991/3. Review: Beszélő.
- Színház a hegyek között./A zakopanei Witkacy színház/.- /Theatre in the mountains. – Witkacy Theatre in Zakopane/
- Schulz i Kantor. In: Teatr Pamięci Brunona Schulza./ The Theatre of memory of Bruno Schulz/. Gdynia, 1993, 132–143
- The Modern European Drama in the Periodicals of Polish Emigracy. /The contradictions of reception as the conflict of generations/. - Conference at the university in Poznan /Poland/, 1993. November.
- Tadeusz Kantor. Halálszínház. Irások a művészetről és a színházról./Tadeusz Kantor. The Theatre of Death. Writings on art and theatre/. Ed., partly translated and essay:Ulyssesnek vissza kell térnie/ Ulysses must return/. Budapest, 1994. 330 pp.
- Ünnep Holstebroban, 30 éves az ODIN teatret, Színház, 1994. Február
- Mentség és magyarázat, Színház, 1995. Március
- Ez nem álom, ez valóság, Vasziljev rendezéséről, Színház, 1994. Július
- Magyar Színpad-Kép-Írók. PQ’95 katalógus. – Catalogue of Hungarian Scenography. Awarded a silver medal at the Prague Quadriennial’95. Ed. in English, German, Hungarian. Budapest, The Hungarian Theatre Museum and Institute.
- Jan Kott. A lehetetlen színház vége. - /Theatre Essays. Ed. partially translated and essay on Kott's writings/. Budapest, The Hungarian Theatre Museum and Institute, 1997,528 pp.
- Az egyszerűség legmagasabb foka./The highest degree of simplicity – on Hamlet directed by Eimuntas Nekrosius/. – In: “Világszínház”, 1997.
- Anatolij Vasziljev. Színházi fúga./Anatoly Vassiliev: Theatre Fuga. Texts on Theatre/. First book edition of complete Vassiliev texts in the world, translated from Russian, French, German, English into the Hungarian language. – Ed. translated and essay. Budapest, The Hungarian Theatre Museum and Institute, 1998.
- Scene by Scene. Stage and set design for Imre Madách's Tragedy of Man. 1883–1998. The prize at the Hungarian Book Week, 2000./ Ed., Preface. Budapest, The Hungarian Theatre Museum and Institute, 1999. 131 pp. Appendix: Madách The Tragedy of Man in the languages of the World and on Stage. 29p+16p.
- Világszínház. Theatre Quarterly in the Hungarian Language on Theatre in the World. Special thematical numbers on Hamlet performances in 20th century, sacred to Strehler and Brecht, on Asian Theatre and Theatre Anthropology,
- Marionette Theatre, Jerzy Grotowski's art/materials of the conference: Grotowski, From Romanticism to Art as Vehicle/, Theatre Iconography and number sacred to Russian stage directors – Meyerhold and Evreinov. - Selected, edited and partly translated.
- Tanítványból Mester. Rec.: Eugenio Barba, The Ashes and Diamond land. In: “Színház”, Grotowski különszám, 2000.
- Józef Szajna – a vizuális narráció színháza. (Józef Szajna: The Theatre of Visual Narration). – “Szellemkép”, 2000/3-4.
- A belső okos sírás Bizánci motívumok a mai kelet-európai színházban. (The Smart Crying Inside- Byzantine Motives in Contemporary Eastern European Theater)– “Napkút”, 2001, április, 73–79.
- Ot ritmicseszkogo szlova k opere (Opernüje posztanovki Meyerholda i Vasziljeva). – (From rhythm of word towards opera). - In: Meyerhold – vek rezsiszjorov. (Meyerhold: A Century of Directing). Paris, CNRS – Moszkva, IISZ, 2001 (Russian language).
- Actor in the Author Theatre:” Acting With Your Whole Self” and “Not/Acting”. In: “FRAKCIJA” performing arts magazine, issue no.20/21, autumn 2001, 72–80.
- A kortárs színház az idei nemzetközi fesztiválok tükrében. (The Contemporary Theatre in the mirror of the International Festivals)– “Szellemkép”, 2001/3-4.
- “Az elődőkkel folytatott párbeszéd”. – (The Dialogue with the Ancestors). Rec. : Eugenio Barba: Papírkenu Budapest 2001 – “Ellenfény”, 2001/4.
- Színházi dialógus- Magyar Nemzet, 2002.4
- A szerzői színház színésze (Actor at the Author's Theatre). – “Palócföld”, 2002. 3–4.szám, 460–468.
- Az emberiség vagy az ember tragédiája, Napkút, 2002/02, 42.
- H7: nowa rola reżysera. (Grzegorz Jarzyna: Uroczystość). (H7: The New Role of the Stage Director - “The Fest” by Grzegorz Jarzyna) .– “Notatnik Teatralny”, 24-25/2002, 165–176
- Tadeusz Łomnicki: komponowanie roli. (Tadeusz Lomnicki: the composition of the role). –“Pamiętnik Teatralny”, 2002,1-4.
- The Hero of the Contemporary East-European Drama in the Masks of the Ancient Greek Tragedy. – “Teatrographia”, Athens, 2003.
- Színházi dialógus, Magyar Nemzet, 2002. április 13., Kultúrgrund
- Dosztojevszkij: A szelíd teremtés- Az emlékezés színháza, Palócföld, 2003.2., 197–205
- Węgierski epizod biografii Gordona Craiga. (Korespondencja E.G.Craiga i Sándora Hevesi). (The Hungarian Episode of Gordon Craig's Biography. – Correspondence between E.G.Craig and Sándor Hevesi) – “Pamiętnik Teatralny”, 2003, 1–2.
- “Elfelejtett emlékezet” Schulz-Gombrowicz-Kantor poétikája (“Forgotten memory”- The Poetics of Schulz-Gombrowicz-Kantor). – “Napkút”, 2005/3, 58.
- Patris Pavis: Színházi Szótár (Dictionnaire du Théâtre – translation into Hungarian language). Scientific lecturing: Nina Király. Budapest, L’Harmattan 2005.
- Ars poetica Tadeusza Kantora (About Cricot-2). – “Konteksty”, Instytut Sztuki PAN, 2005/1, 77.old.
- Utópia-Álom-Misztérium (Utopia-Dream-Mystery play – four performances of the Hungarian National Theatre) – „Palócföld”, 2005/3.
- Misteria Leona Schillera w europejskim kontekście teatralnym. (Leon Schiller's mysteries in the context of the European theatre). – „Pamiętnik Teatralny”, 2005/1-2.
- Instrumentarium (Jerzego Grzegorzewskiego). – “Notatnik Teatralny”, 2006/42
- Lejegyzéstől az elemzésig, (From Recording to Analyzing) Napkút, 2007/05, 114.
- Kazimierz Dejmek: metamorfozy misterium - od średniowiecza do Majakowskiego. Kazimierz Dejmek: metamorphoses of mystery – from mediaeval towards Majakovsky. –“In memoriam Kazimierz Dejmek”. – “Studies of Lódź University”, 2007.
- Teatr Polski, Litwy i Rosji XX wieku-The Polish, Lithuanian and Russian Theatre of the Twentieth Century. Tczew 2007. Project EU . Editorship: Nina Király, Agnieszka Koecher-Hensel. In: Powrót Odysa Wyspiańskiego według Tadeusza Kantora, Jerzego Grzegorzewskiego I Kristyana Lupy (Wyspianski's The Return of Odysseus according to Tadeusz Kantor, Jerzy Grzegorzewski and Kristyan Lupa), 10–13.
- Dramaturg węgierski w hierarchii współtwórców dzieła scenicznego (The Hungarian Dramaturg in the hierarchy of the creators the scenic work). – “ Notatnik Teatralny”, Wrocław, 2010.
- A színész ösztöne + technika, (The Actor's Intuitions + Technique), Napkút, 2011/3
- Színház és emlékezet, életút interjú Király Ninával, Szcenárium, II. évf. 3., 2014
- Tadeusz Różewicz költői színházáról, Szcenárium, II.évf. 5, 2014
- A krakkói Ulysses, Szcenárium, IV. évf. 3., 2016
- The Krakow Ulysses, Szcenárium, IV. évf. 4., 2016

== Articles about Nina, Interviews ==
Zarándok és ellenálló- Beszélő kritika,1992/1

Változatok az emigrációra- Magyar Nemzet, 1992-08

Kantor- A visszatérés- (Kantor- The Return) Beszélő kritika, 1994/4

OSZMI igazgatói kinevezés- Magyar Nemzet, 1994.05

Tadeusz Kantor a Lengyel Intézetben- (Tadeusz Kantor at the Polish Institute) Magyar Nemzet, 1994.11

PQ, Kurír, (1995.07)

Mennyit nyom a latban egy ezüst- (How Much is a Silver Worth) Népszabadság, 1995.július.15

Nina színháza, (Nina's Theater) Kurír, 1995.08

Dán királyfi minden mennyiségben, (Danish Prince in All Quantities) Népszava, 1998.01

A végtelen gondolat- Jan Kott esszéiről- (The Endless Though- On Jan Kott's Essays)- Népszabadság, 1998.01

Ablak a tragédia világára- (Window onto The Tragedy's World), Népszabadság könyv kritika, 1999.11

Határtalanul - (No Borders- Tunde Trojan's interview with Nina Kiraly) Trojan Tünde beszélget Király Ninával

«Балтийский дом»: «Дядя Ваня» Люка Персиваля и «Три сестры» Римаса Туминаса (interjú Ninával Tuminasról)

Jászai Mari díj, (Jaszai award) Magyar Nemzet, 2012.03

A kerítőnő-Peterdi Nagy László búcsúja Ninától (The Procuress- A Farewell to Nina from Laszlo Peterdi Nagy), 2018

Remembering Nina Kiraly (by Patricia Paszt)

“We Understand Our Culture Better Through The Other’s”: Interview With Dramaturg And Theatre Historian Nina Király(1940–2018).

== Legacy ==
Nina Kiraly's professional library consisting of more than a 1000 books on theater written in Polish, Hungarian, English, and French, together with her manuscripts and correspondence with such theater directors and theoreticians as Jan Kott, Eugenio Barba, Zbigniew Raszewski, Anatoly Vasiliev were donated by the family in 2019 to the National Széchényi Library in Budapest, Hungary where they will be made researchable for the general public.

== See also ==
- Theatre of Poland
- Mari Jászai
- Tadeusz Kantor
- OSZMI The Hungarian Theatre Museum and Institute
