= Cabreros del Río =

Cabreros del Río Cabreiros del Ríu
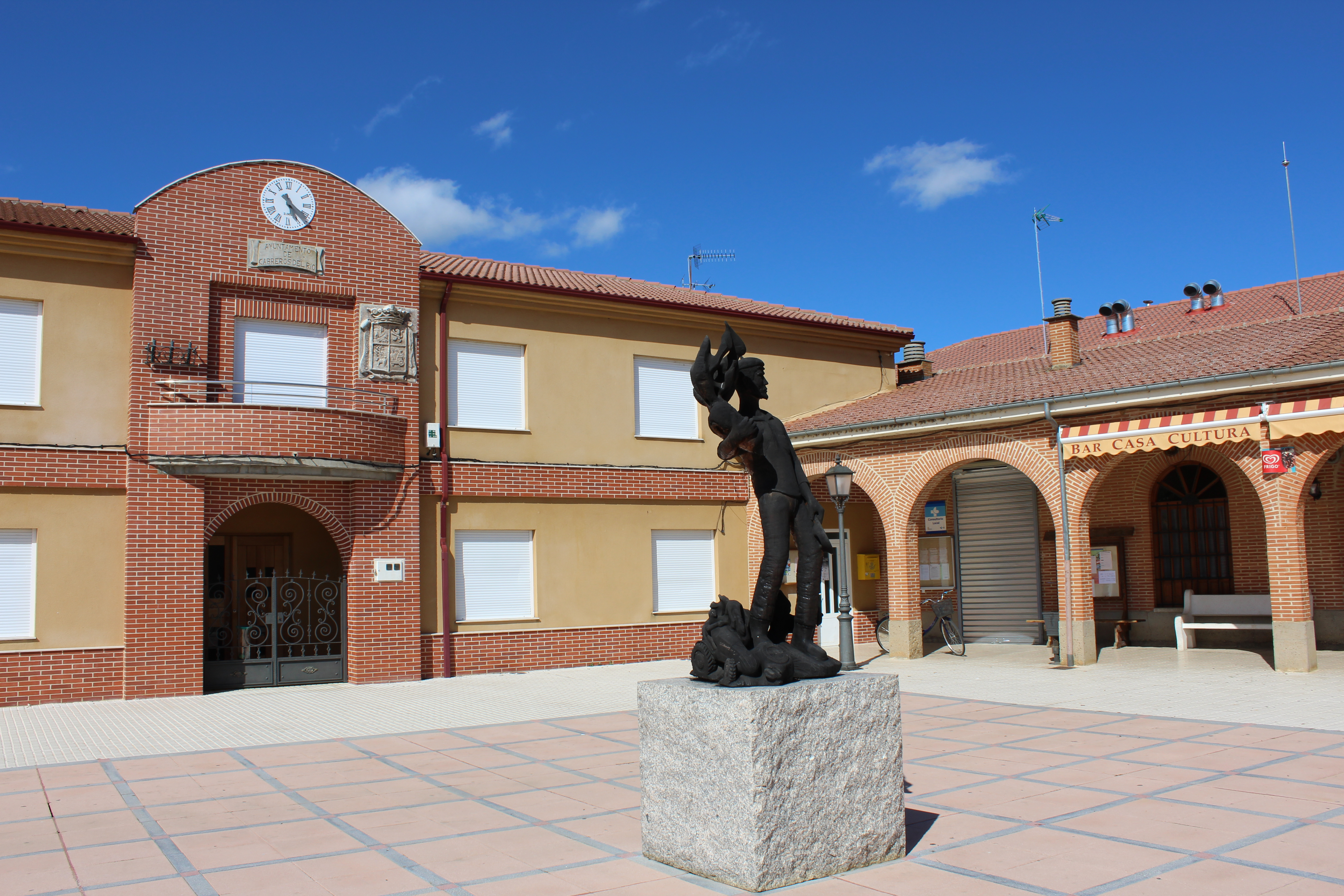

- Location within Spain
- Coordinates: 42°24′4″N 5°32′26″W
- Country: Spain
- Autonomous community: Castile and León
- Province: León
- Municipality: Cabreros del Río

Government
  - Mayor: Matías Llorente Liébana (PSOE)

Area
  - Total: 24.77 km^{2} (9.56 sq mi)
- Elevation: 763 m (2,503 ft)

Population (2025-01-01)
  - Total: 406
  - Density: 16.4/km^{2} (42.5/sq mi)
- Demonym: cabrerense
- Time zone: UTC+1 (CET)
  - Summer (DST): UTC+2 (CEST)
- Postal Code: 24224
- Telephone prefix: 987
- Website: Ayto. de Cabreros del Río

Cabreros del Río (Spanish pronunciation: [kaˈβɾeɾos ðel ˈri.o], Leonese: Cabreiros del Ríu)) is a municipality located in the province of León, Castile and León, Spain. According to the 2010 census (INE), the municipality has a population of 481 inhabitants.

== People from Cabreros del Río ==
- Gregorio Baró (1928–2012), Spanish-Argentine scientist
