= Ion Șiugariu =

Ion Șiugariu (June 6, 1914 – February 1, 1945) was a Romanian poet.

== Early life and education ==
Born in Băița, Maramureș County, then part of Austria-Hungary, his parents were Ion Șugar, a miner, and his wife Floarea (née Griga). He was the first of six sons, and from age seven to ten was obliged to work in gold mining to help support the poor family. Following the union of Transylvania with Romania, he attended primary school in his native village and in Valea Borcutului, finishing in 1928. He then went to the normal school in Oradea from 1928 to 1932 and to the city's Emanuil Gojdu High School from 1932 to 1936. There, he was mentored by Octav Șuluțiu, who introduced him to the Familia circle. From 1937 to 1942, he attended the literature and philosophy faculty of the University of Bucharest, graduating with a thesis on the journalistic aspect of modern literature.

== Career ==
His later university years coincided with Romania's participation in World War II, and Șiugariu was briefly called up twice during this period. In July 1942, he obtained a passport and crossed into Hungarian-occupied Northern Transylvania, seeing his parents for the last time in Băița. Considered undesirable by the temporary authorities due to his political stance, he had to take a 12 km (7.5 mi) walk daily to the gendarmes' post for visa purposes. He attempted a second trip later that year, but was denied approval.

In January 1943, Șiugariu became a reserve officer and was sent to Ploiești for training, then to an infantry regiment in Bacău, in the Moldavia region. That July, during a two-week leave, he married pharmacy student Lucia Stroescu in Râmnicu Vâlcea. In 1944, after Romania switched sides to the Allies, he participated in the Romanian Army's push into Central Europe, reaching the Czechoslovak Front. He was killed in early 1945 during the battle for the Slovak town of Brezno. The same year, he was posthumously decorated with the Order of the Crown. Devastated by the news, his 56-year-old father died of double pneumonia a month after his son. In 1956, he was reburied in the Romanian military cemetery at Zvolen.

Șiugariu's first published work was "Imnul tinereții", a poem that appeared in the Beiuș magazine Observatorul in 1934. His first book was the 1938 poetry volume Trecere prin alba poartă, followed by two other collections: Paradisul peregrinar (1942) and Țara de foc (1943). He contributed critical commentary and poems to the magazines Familia, Universul literar, Gând românesc, Pagini literare, Gândirea, and Vremea. Carnetele unui poet căzut în război was published in 1968 through the efforts of Laurențiu Fulga. This was a diary in epistolary form, written with a lucidity reminiscent of Camil Petrescu. The book also contains a set of previously unpublished poems. Șiugariu's verses alternate between an exuberance for life and a nostalgia for salvation.
