= Emanuil Gojdu National College =

- Colegiul Național Emanuil Gojdu
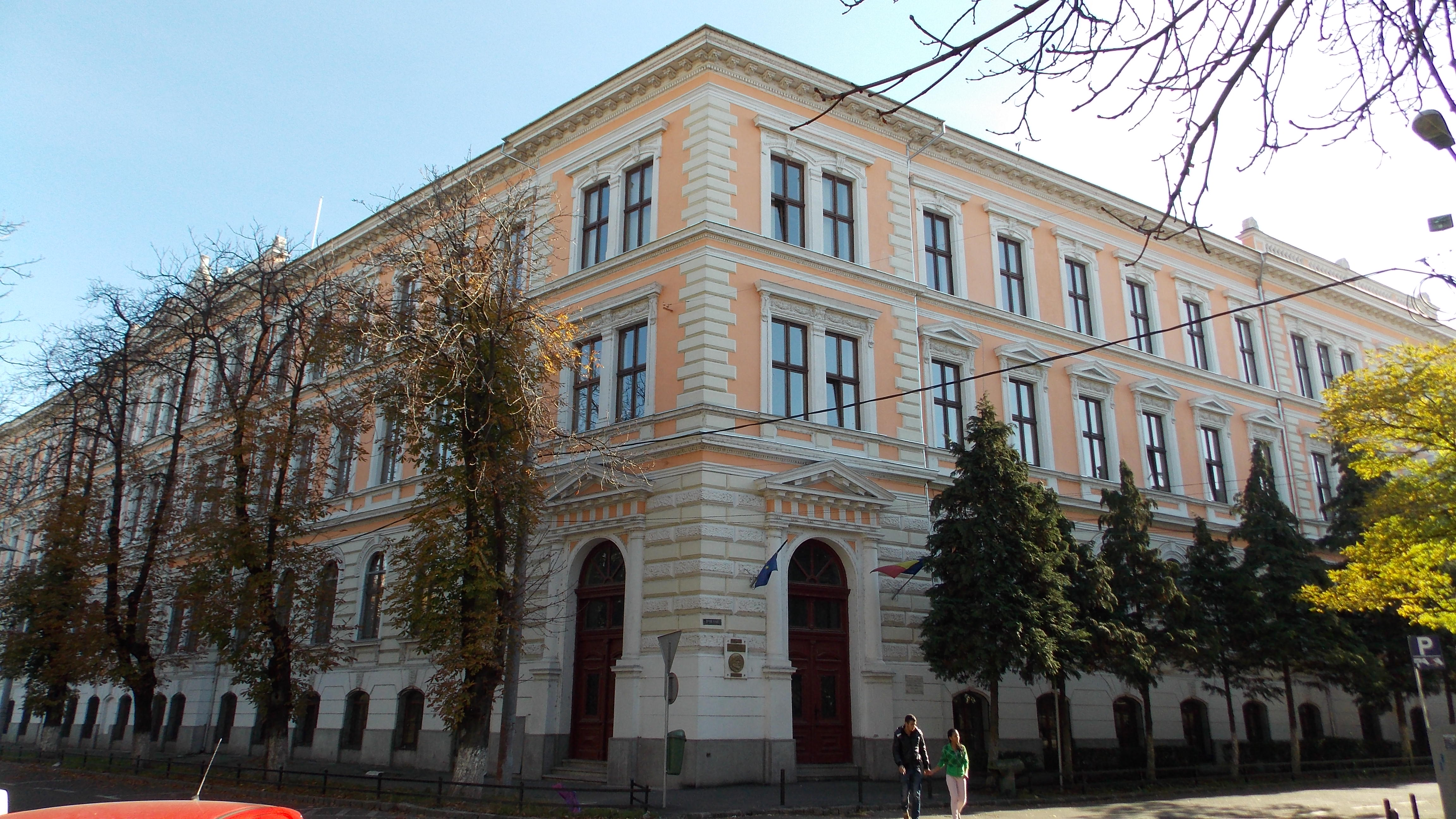

Location
- Strada Spiru Haret, Nr. 3-5, Oradea, Bihor County; Romania
- Coordinates: 47.0547°N 21.9377°E

Information
- Type: Public
- Established: 15 June 1919
- Principal: Anca Maria Marchiș
- Grades: 5–12
- Enrollment: 1,166
- Website: www.lego.rdsor.ro

Emanuil Gojdu National College (Romanian: Colegiul Național Emanuil Gojdu) is a high school located at 3-5 Spiru Haret Street in Oradea, Romania. It is named after Emanoil Gojdu. The College, which was founded on 15 June 1919, has a long history in teaching, being focused on science subjects. "Țara visurilor noastre" is its official magazine.

The school building, with a construction date of 1895–1896, was designed by architect Ferenc Knapp; it is listed as a historic monument by Romania's Ministry of Culture and Religious Affairs.

== Alumni ==
- Ilie Bolojan, politician
- Caius Iacob, mathematician
- Gyula Király, literary historian
- Tiberiu Olah, composer
- Dorin N. Poenaru, nuclear physicist and engineer
- Eric Pop, engineer and academic
- Ion Șiugariu, poet
- Mircea Zaciu, critic, literary historian, and prose writer
