= Nucleonica =

- Website type: Online nuclear science applications
- Available in: English
- Owner: Nucleonica GmbH
- Creator: Joseph Magill
- Website: www.nucleonica.com
- Registration: Free access available
- Launched: 1 March 2011; 15 years ago (Note: This is the date the spin-off company took over, other sources seem to indicate the portal was in use earlier)
- Current status: Online

Nucleonica is a nuclear science web portal created by the European Commission's Joint Research Centre. which was later spun off to the company Nucleonica GmbH in March 2011.

== History ==
The company Nucleonica GmbH was founded by Dr. Joseph Magill in 2011 as a spin-off from the European Commission's Joint Research Centre, Institute for Transuranium Elements. In addition to providing user friendly access to nuclear data, the main focus of Nucleonica is to provide professionals in the nuclear industry with a suite of validated scientific applications for everyday calculations.

The portal is also suitable for education and training in the nuclear field, both for technicians and degree-level and programmes in Nuclear engineering technology.

Nucleonica GmbH also took responsibility for the management and development of the Karlsruhe Nuclide Chart print and online versions.

== User access ==
Users can register for free access to Nucleonica. This free access gives the user access to most applications but is restricted to a limited number of nuclides. For full access to all nuclides and applications, the user can upgrade to Premium for which there is an annual user charge.

== Sources ==
- Cern (2017). "Nucleonica | CERN Scientific Information Service". library.cern. Archived from the original on 13 June 2019.
- EU Science Hub (9 August 2016) [2013]. "New JRC spin-off company to work on the Nucleonica portal". EU Science Hub - European Commission. Archived from the original on 13 July 2019.
- Excelsior (1 June 2015). "School of Business and Technology Adds Nuclear Science Resource". Archived from the original on 27 November 2019.
- Forschungszentrum Jülich (2017). "Trainingsprogramm 2017" [Training programme 2017] (PDF). Forschungszentrum Jülich (in German). Nucleonica. Archived (PDF) from the original on 27 November 2019.
- Magill, Joseph; Galy, J; Dreher, Raymond; et al. (2009). "NUCLEONICA: a nuclear science portal".
- Masterson, Robert (2017). Nuclear engineering fundamentals : a practical perspective. OCLC 1048280746.
