= Gyula Király (historian) =

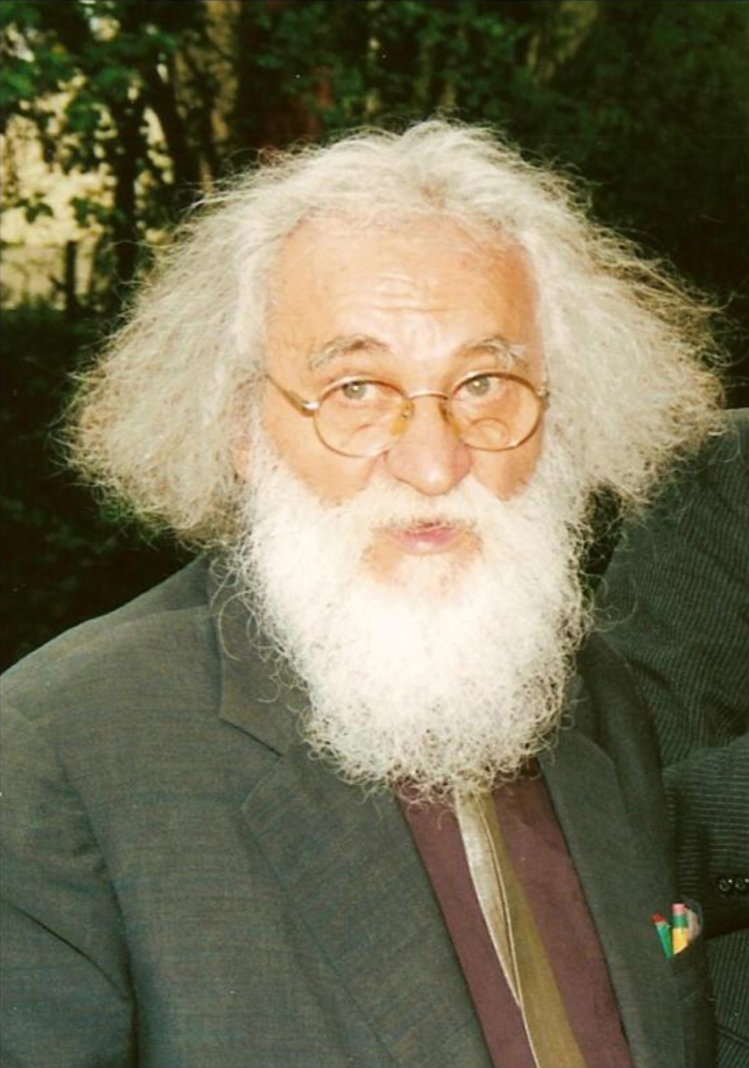
- Born: January 26, 1927; Santăul Mic, Romania
- Died: January 17, 2011; Budapest, Hungary
- Education: Ph.D. (1969) in Literary Sciences
- Alma mater: Lomonosov University, Moscow
- Known for: Expert on Dostoevsky and the Russian Novel
- Notable work: Dosztojevszkij és az orosz próza (Dostoevsky and the Russian Novel)
- Spouse: Nina Király
- Website: www.kiralyfoundation.hu/gyula-kiraly

Gyula Király (January 26, 1927 – January 17, 2011) was a literary historian who lived and worked in Budapest, Hungary.

== Biography ==
Király was born in Santăul Mic (Kisszántó), a village in northwestern Romania, along the border with Hungary. He attended high school at the University of Debrecen, Hungary, then at the Gojdu High School in Oradea, Romania. He graduated from the Leningrad State University's Philology Department (1953). From 1953 to 1960 he was an assistant professor, and from 1953 to 1960 an adjunct lecturer in the Russian Philology Department of the Debrecen Kossuth Lajos University (KLTE ) in Budapest. From 1960 to 1964 he did post-doctoral studies at the Moscow Lomonosov University. From 1964 to 1968 he was adjunct lecturer, from 1969 to 1992 associate professor, and in 1993 honorary professor in the Department of Russian Philology of Eötvös Loránd University (ELTE). In 1975-76 he was on scholarship at the Gorky Institute of World Literature.

== Career ==
- 1949-1953 studies at the Leningrad State (Zhdanov) University Arts Faculty
- 1953-1960 assistant lecturer at Debrecen Kossuth Lajos University Faculty of Russian Philology
- 1960-1964 postgraduate studies at the Moscow Lomonosov University
- 1964-1970 senior lecturer at the ELTE Eötvös Loránd University Russian Faculty
- 1969 PhD in Literary Sciences
- 1970-2001 professor at the ELTE Eötvös József Collegium Russistic-Poetic Workshop
- 1970-1993 associate professor at ELTE BTK Russian Faculty
- 1993 honorary associate professor at ELTE BTK
- 1993-1996 lecturing professor and scientific advisor at ELTE BTK Eastern, Slavic and Baltic Philology Department
- 1996 lecturing professor at Károli Gáspár University of the Reformed Church in Hungary BTK World and Comparative Literature Department

== Grants ==
- 1960-1964 MTA-aspirantúra Hungarian Academy of Sciences, Moscow Lomonosov University
- 1975-1976 Keldis-grant, Institute of World Literature (Gorky), Moscow
- 1985 MTA Hungarian Academy of Sciences research grant, Jagellonian University, Slavic Institute, Cracow, Poland

== Books ==
- Az orosz irodalom története a XIX. század második felében (1856-1900), Karancsy László – Király Gyula, Budapest, 1960. 336 p. (The History of Russian Literature in the Second Half of the Nineteenth Century, with László Karancsy)
- Élmények és gondolatok. Szovjet esszék, válogatás, jegyzetek Király Gyula, Európa Könyvkiadó, Budapest, 1965. 275p. (Experience and thought. Soviet essays - selection and commentaries)
- Poetika. Trudi russkih i sovetskih poetičeskih skol, válogatás, jegyzetek Király Gyula - Kovács Árpád, Tankönyvkiadó, Budapest, 1982. 800 p. (Poetics. Studies by Russian and Soviet schools of Poetics - Selection and commentaries with Árpád Kovács)
- Dosztojevszkij és az orosz próza. Műfajpoétikai tanulmányok, Akadémiai Kiadó, Budapest, 1983. 513p. (Dostoevsky and the Russian Prose)

== Legacy ==
Király’s professional library will be donated to the Hungarian Academy of Sciences (MTA) it will be open to researchers.
