= SystemX =

French Institute for Technological Research (IRT)

Coordinates: 48.7127°N 2.1929°E

SystemX is a French Institute for Technological Research (IRT) established February 1, 2012, in the framework of the “Investment for the Future” program that was set up to support French Innovation.

A total of 8 IRTs have been created by the government. The only IRT in the Île-de-France region is dedicated to the digital engineering of complex systems.

The institute includes 100 to 250 researchers, of which 50 were hired by SystemX. The annual budget is € 30M. Legally, it is a Scientific Research Foundation. Its head office is in Nano-Innov with other offices in Inria and Paris.

== Strategy ==
SystemX’s functioning lies on two fundamental aspects:

- The Institute gathers all the partners involved in its projects in one location. The idea is to foster synergies between academic and industrial communities;
- Skill and platform pooling: by reaching a critical mass, SystemX plans to create a platform by pooling skills and technological elements.

== Management ==
- Chief Executive Officer: Paul Labrogère
- Research and Technology Director: Bruno Foyer
- Scientific Director: Patrice Aknin

== Saclay ecosystem ==
Thanks to its location on the Saclay plateau, host to the future Paris-Saclay University, SystemX benefits from Systematic Paris-Region competitiveness cluster and the Paris-Saclay Campus' dynamics – ranked among the world's top 8 world innovation clusters by MIT Technology Review.

== History ==
- February 21, 2013: SystemX’s official inauguration
- October 31, 2012: Convention signing with ANR (Agence Nationale de la Recherche), the French National Research Agency.
- February 1, 2012: Labelling announcement as part of the “Great Loan” (Grand Emprunt) in the framework of the “Investment for the Future” program).
