= Cluster decay =

Radioactive decay by emitting a nucleus

Cluster decay, also known as heavy particle radioactivity, is a rare type of radioactive decay in which an unstable atomic nucleus emits a small cluster of protons and neutrons, that is to say an atomic nucleus. The emitted nucleus (cluster) is larger than an alpha particle (a ^{4}_{2}He nucleus) which has two protons and two neutrons), but is smaller than the typical fragments produced in spontaneous fission. In a nuclear fission process, the masses of the two nuclei that emerge are usually relatively close to one another.

The cluster decay process is a way for a heavy, unstable atom to become more stable. For example, an atom of ^{223}_{88}Ra can emit a ^{14}_{6}C nucleus (which contains 6 protons and 8 neutrons) and transform into a more stable ^{209}_{82}Pb atom.

Cluster decay was theoretically predicted in 1980 by Aureliu Săndulescu, Dorin N. Poenaru, and Walter Greiner, and was first experimentally confirmed in 1984 by H. J. Rose and G. A. Jones.

== Mechanism ==
Like alpha decay, cluster decay is a quantum tunneling process. The cluster of protons and neutrons forms inside the parent nucleus and must penetrate a Coulomb barrier to escape. The process is highly unlikely, which is why cluster decay is a rare phenomenon, with branching ratios relative to alpha decay being very small.

The decay transforms the parent nucleus (with atomic number Z and mass number A) into a daughter nucleus (Z_{d}, A_{d}) by emitting a nuclear cluster (Z_{e}, A_{e}). The number of protons and neutrons is conserved:

Z = Z_{d} + Z_{e}
A = A_{d} + A_{e}

The following example shows the decay of ^{223}_{88}Ra into ^{209}_{82}Pb by emission of a ^{14}_{6}C cluster:

^{223}_{88}Ra → ^{14}_{6}C + ^{209}_{82}Pb

The energy released in the decay (the Q-value) is converted into the kinetic energy of the fragments. As required by the conservation of momentum, the lighter emitted cluster carries away most of this energy. The kinetic energy of the cluster, E_{k}, is approximately:

$$E_k \approx Q \frac{A_d}{A}$$

This decay mode is intermediate between standard alpha decay, where a light helium nucleus is emitted, and spontaneous fission, which splits a nucleus into two or more large fragments with a probabilistic mass distribution. In cluster decay, the emitted particle is a specific light nucleus, not a range of possible fragments.

The branching ratio with respect to alpha decay is rather small (see the Table below):

$$B = T_a / T_c$$

where T_{a} and T_{c} are the half-lives of the parent nucleus relative to alpha decay and cluster radioactivity, respectively.

== History ==
The first information about the atomic nucleus was obtained at the beginning of the 20th century by studying radioactivity. For a long period of time only three kinds of nuclear decay modes (alpha, beta, and gamma) were known. They illustrate three of the fundamental interactions in nature: strong, weak, and electromagnetic. Spontaneous fission became better studied soon after its discovery in 1940 by Konstantin Petrzhak and Georgy Flyorov because of both the military and the peaceful applications of induced fission. This was discovered circa 1939 by Otto Hahn, Lise Meitner, and Fritz Strassmann.

There are many other kinds of radioactivity, e.g. cluster decay, proton emission, various beta-delayed decay modes (p, 2p, 3p, n, 2n, 3n, 4n, d, t, alpha, f), fission isomers, particle accompanied (ternary) fission, etc. The height of the potential barrier, mainly of Coulomb nature, for emission of the charged particles is much higher than the observed kinetic energy of the emitted particles. The spontaneous decay can only be explained by quantum tunneling in a similar way to the first application of the Quantum Mechanics to Nuclei given by George Gamow for alpha decay.

In 1980 A. Sandulescu, D.N. Poenaru, and W. Greiner described calculations indicating the possibility of a new type of decay of heavy nuclei intermediate between alpha decay and spontaneous fission. The first observation of heavy-ion radioactivity was that of a 30-MeV, carbon-14 emission from radium-223 by H.J. Rose and G.A. Jones in 1984.

— Encyclopædia Britannica,

Usually the theory explains an already experimentally observed phenomenon. Cluster decay is one of the rare examples of phenomena predicted before experimental discovery. Theoretical predictions were made in 1980, four years before experimental discovery.

Four theoretical approaches were used: fragmentation theory by solving a Schrödinger equation with mass asymmetry as a variable to obtain the mass distributions of fragments; penetrability calculations similar to those used in traditional theory of alpha decay, and superasymmetric fission models, numerical (NuSAF) and analytical (ASAF). Superasymmetric fission models are based on the macroscopic-microscopic approach using the asymmetrical two-center shell model level energies as input data for the shell and pairing corrections. Either the liquid drop model or the Yukawa-plus-exponential model extended to different charge-to-mass ratios have been used to calculate the macroscopic deformation energy.

Penetrability theory predicted eight decay modes: ^{14}C, ^{24}Ne, ^{28}Mg, ^{32,34}Si, ^{46}Ar, and ^{48,50}Ca from the following parent nuclei: ^{222,224}Ra, ^{230,232}Th, ^{236,238}U, ^{244,246}Pu, ^{248,250}Cm, ^{250,252}Cf, ^{252,254}Fm, and ^{252,254}No.

The first experimental report was published in 1984, when physicists at Oxford University discovered that ^{223}Ra emits one ^{14}C nucleus among every billion (10^{9}) decays by alpha emission.

== Theory ==
The quantum tunneling may be calculated either by extending fission theory to a larger mass asymmetry or by heavier emitted particle from alpha decay theory.

Both fission-like and alpha-like approaches are able to express the decay constant $\lambda = \ln 2 / T_\text{c}$ , as a product of three model-dependent quantities

$$\lambda = \nu S P_\text{s}$$

where $\nu$ is the frequency of assaults on the barrier per second, S is the preformation probability of the cluster at the nuclear surface, and P_{s} is the penetrability of the external barrier. In alpha-like theories S is an overlap integral of the wave function of the three partners (parent, daughter, and emitted cluster). In a fission theory the preformation probability is the penetrability of the internal part of the barrier from the initial turning point R_{i} to the touching point R_{t}. Very frequently it is calculated by using the Wentzel-Kramers-Brillouin (WKB) approximation.

A very large number, of the order 10^{5}, of parent-emitted cluster combinations were considered in a systematic search for new decay modes. The large amount of computations could be performed in a reasonable time by using the ASAF model developed by Dorin N Poenaru, Walter Greiner, et al. The model was the first to be used to predict measurable quantities in cluster decay. More than 150 cluster decay modes have been predicted before any other kind of half-lives calculations have been reported. Comprehensive tables of half-lives, branching ratios, and kinetic energies have been published, e.g. Potential barrier shapes similar to that considered within the ASAF model have been calculated by using the macroscopic-microscopic method.

Previously it was shown that even alpha decay may be considered a particular case of cold fission. The ASAF model may be used to describe in a unified manner cold alpha decay, cluster decay, and cold fission (see figure 6.7, p. 287 of the Ref. [2]).

One can obtain with good approximation one universal curve (UNIV) for any kind of cluster decay mode with a mass number Ae, including alpha decay

$$\log T = -\log P_s - 22.169 + 0.598(A_e - 1)$$

In a logarithmic scale the equation log T = f(log P_{s}) represents a single straight line which can be conveniently used to estimate the half-life. A single universal curve for alpha decay and cluster decay modes results by expressing log T + log S = f(log P_{s}). The experimental data on cluster decay in three groups of even-even, even-odd, and odd-even parent nuclei are reproduced with comparable accuracy by both types of universal curves, fission-like UNIV and UDL derived using alpha-like R-matrix theory.

In order to find the released energy

$$Q = [M - (M_d + M_e)]c^2$$

one can use the compilation of measured masses M, M_{d}, and M_{e} of the parent, daughter, and emitted nuclei, c is the light velocity. The mass excess is transformed into energy according to the Einstein's formula E = mc^{2}.

== Experiments ==
The main experimental difficulty in observing cluster decay comes from the need to identify a few rare events against a background of alpha particles. The quantities experimentally determined are the partial half-life, T_{c}, and the kinetic energy of the emitted cluster E_{k}. There is also a need to identify the emitted particle.

Detection of radiation is based leading mainly to ionization of matter. Using a semiconductor telescope and conventional electronics to identify the ^{14}C ions, Rose and Jones's first successful experiment required about six months in order to get 11 useful events.

With modern magnetic spectrometers (SOLENO and Enge-split pole), at Orsay and Argonne National Laboratory (see ch. 7 in Ref. [2] pp. 188–204), very strong sources can be used, allowing results to be obtained in a run of few hours.

Solid state nuclear track detectors (SSNTD) insensitive to alpha particles (cheap and handy but need chemical etching and microscope scanning) and magnetic spectrometers in which alpha particles are deflected by a strong magnetic field have been used to overcome this difficulty.

Key experiments on cluster decay modes have been performed in Berkeley, Orsay, Dubna, and Milano, with leading researchers being P. Buford Price, Eid Hourany, Michel Hussonnois, Svetlana Tretyakova, A. A. Ogloblin, Roberto Bonetti, and their coworkers.

The 20 emitters experimentally observed lie in the range 87 ≤ Z ≤ 96: ^{221}Fr, ^{221-224,226}Ra, ^{223,225}Ac, ^{228,230}Th, ^{231}Pa, ^{230,232-236}U, ^{236,238}Pu, and ^{242}Cm. Only upper limits could be detected in the following cases: ^{12}C decay of ^{114}Ba, ^{15}N decay of ^{223}Ac, ^{18}O decay of ^{226}Th, ^{24,26}Ne decays of ^{232}Th and of ^{236}U, ^{28}Mg decays of ^{232,233,235}U, ^{30}Mg decay of ^{237}Np, and ^{34}Si decay of ^{240}Pu and of ^{241}Am.

Some of the cluster emitters are members of the three natural radioactive families (^{223,224,226}Ra, ^{228,230}Th, ^{231}Pa, and ^{234,235}U); all can be produced by artificial nuclear reactions. No odd-odd emitter has been observed, and no odd-odd emitted cluster either.

From many decay modes with half-lives and branching ratios relative to alpha decay predicted with the analytical superasymmetric fission (ASAF) model, the following 11 have been experimentally confirmed: ^{14}C, ^{20}O, ^{23}F, ^{22,24-26}Ne, ^{28,30}Mg, and ^{32,34}Si. The experimental data are in good agreement with predicted values. A strong shell effect can be seen: as a rule the shortest value of the half-life is obtained when the daughter nucleus has a magic number of neutrons (N_{d} = 126) and/or protons (Z_{d} = 82). The relatively shortest cluster half-lives are attained for even-even nuclei that reach the doubly-magic ^{208}Pb directly by emission of a relatively stable cluster: ^{222}Ra, ^{228}Th, ^{230,232}U, ^{236}Pu, and ^{242}Cm.

The known cluster emissions as of 2008 (there seem to be no newer results) are as follows:

Isotope	Emitted particle	Branching ratio	log T(s)	Q (MeV)
^{221}Fr	^{14}C	8.14×10^{−13}	14.52	31.290
^{221}Ra	^{14}C	1.15×10^{−12}	13.39	32.394
^{222}Ra	^{14}C	3.7×10^{−10}	11.01	33.049
^{223}Ra	^{14}C	8.9×10^{−10}	15.04	31.829
^{224}Ra	^{14}C	4.3×10^{−11}	15.86	30.535
^{226}Ra	^{14}C	3.2×10^{−11}	21.19	28.196
^{223}Ac	^{14}C	3.2×10^{−11}	12.60	33.064
^{225}Ac	^{14}C	4.5×10^{−12}	17.28	30.476
^{228}Th	^{20}O	1.13×10^{−13}	20.72	44.723
^{230}Th	^{24}Ne	5.6×10^{−13}	24.61	57.758
^{231}Pa	^{23}F	9.97×10^{−15}	26.02	51.844
^{231}Pa	^{24}Ne	1.34×10^{−11}	22.88	60.408
^{230}U	^{22}Ne	4.8×10^{−14}	19.57	61.388
^{232}U	^{24}Ne	9.16×10^{−12}	20.40	62.309
^{233}U	^{24}Ne or ^{25}Ne	7.2×10^{−13}	24.84	60.484, 60.776
^{234}U	^{28}Mg	1.38×10^{−13}	25.14	74.108
^{234}U	^{24}Ne or ^{26}Ne	9.9×10^{−14}	25.88	58.825, 59.465
^{235}U	^{24}Ne or ^{25}Ne	8.06×10^{−12}	27.42	57.361, 57.756
^{236}U	^{28}Mg or ^{30}Mg	2×10^{−13}	27.58	70.560, 72.299
^{236}Pu	^{28}Mg	2.7×10^{−14}	21.52	79.668
^{238}Pu	^{32}Si	1.38×10^{−16}	25.27	91.188
^{238}Pu	^{28}Mg or ^{30}Mg	5.62×10^{−17}	25.70	75.910, 76.822
^{242}Cm	^{34}Si	1×10^{−16}	23.15	96.508

== Fine structure ==
The fine structure in ^{14}C radioactivity of ^{223}Ra was discussed for the first time by M. Greiner and W. Scheid in 1986. The superconducting spectrometer SOLENO of IPN Orsay has been used since 1984 to identify ^{14}C clusters emitted from ^{222–224,226}Ra nuclei. Moreover, it was used to discover the fine structure observing transitions to excited states of the daughter. A transition with an excited state of ^{14}C predicted in Ref. was not yet observed.

Surprisingly, the experimentalists had seen a transition to the first excited state of the daughter stronger than that to the ground state. The transition is favoured if the uncoupled nucleon is left in the same state in both parent and daughter nuclei. Otherwise the difference in nuclear structure leads to a large hindrance.

The interpretation was confirmed: the main spherical component of the deformed parent wave function has an i_{11/2} character, i.e. the main component is spherical.
