= Otto Krause =

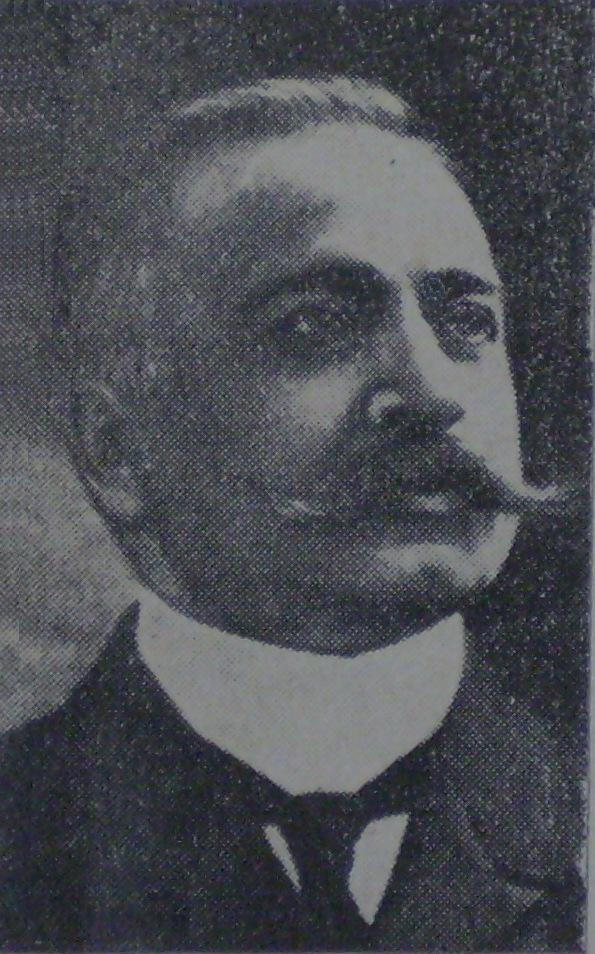
- Born: July 10, 1856; Chivilcoy, Buenos Aires Province
- Died: February 14, 1920 (aged 63); Buenos Aires
- Occupation: Engineer
- Parents: Leopoldina Krause; Carl August Krause
- Relatives: Elisa Krause (sister); Julio Krause (brother); Domingo Krause (brother); Faustino Krause (brother)

Signature
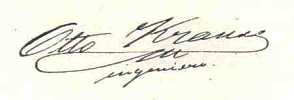

Otto Krause (July 10, 1856 – February 14, 1920) was an Argentine engineer and educator.

== Early life ==
Krause was born in the Buenos Aires Province town of Chivilcoy to Leopoldina and Carl August Krause, both German Argentine immigrants arrived in 1851. Tending his farm with implements he brought from Germany, Carl Krause instilled an interest in machinery to his five children, though the family eventually relocated to Buenos Aires in 1870. Otto subsequently finished his secondary school studies at the prestigious Buenos Aires National College, a public college preparatory school.

== Engineer and educator ==
He enrolled at the University of Buenos Aires School of Exact Sciences in 1874, though he enlisted in the Argentine Navy as an engineer's assistant later that year. He returned to civilian life in 1878 and obtained a degree in civil engineering, earning a post in the Buenos Aires Teachers' School. Krause then began a career in the Argentine railways, working in the planning department of the Buenos Aires Western Railway in 1879 and later contributing to the lines' extension into then-remote Tucumán and Salta Provinces.

Returning to Buenos Aires in 1882, Krause held technical positions at the 11th of September Station, then the site of a large railyard. He continued to teach the discipline, and in 1887 was commissioned to select material in Europe for the new rail line and facilities to serve the recently founded city of La Plata. The experience earned him a post of technical director of the new mail train established by president Miguel Juárez Celman in 1888, and he became a tenured full professor at the University of Buenos Aires in 1891.

Addressing the rapidly growing country's lack of formal technical schools, he established Argentina's first on March 15, 1897, and two years later, President Julio Roca re-chartered the institution as the National Industrial School, entitling it to public funds. Krause divided his time between the management of the school and diverse public posts, including that of President of the Municipal Tax Court and inspector of mines in the far-western San Juan Province. He continued to teach at his alma mater, as well, and in 1906 was named Dean of the School of Exact Sciences at the university. His efforts on behalf of technical schools included the 1909 inaugural of a new, important building for the National Industrial School in Buenos Aires' San Telmo area (just south of downtown), as well as the establishment of affiliates in La Plata, Rosario, Santa Fe and his hometown, Chivilcoy, among others.

Krause helped plan irrigation works for the Río Negro valley in semi-arid Patagonia before retiring in 1911. He returned in advisory capacity to the University of Buenos Aires in 1919, but died the following February at age 63; the National Industrial School was subsequently renamed the Otto Krause Technical School.

== Legacy and Influence ==
Otto Krause's contributions to technical education in Argentina had a lasting impact. The Otto Krause Technical School, renamed in his honor, continued to be a leading institution for industrial and technical training in the country. His educational model, which emphasized practical skills alongside theoretical knowledge, influenced the development of technical education throughout Argentina and beyond.

== Publications and Academic Work ==
Throughout his career, Krause authored several textbooks and technical manuals that were widely used in Argentine schools and universities. His works covered various engineering disciplines, including mechanics, hydraulics, and industrial processes. These publications helped standardize technical education curricula across the country and served as valuable resources for students and professionals alike.

== Personal Life and Character ==
Despite his numerous professional accomplishments, Krause was known for his modest and unassuming nature. He was deeply committed to education and believed in the power of technical knowledge to drive national progress. Colleagues and students remembered him as a patient and dedicated teacher who could explain complex concepts with clarity and enthusiasm.

== International Recognition ==
Krause's work in technical education gained recognition beyond Argentina's borders. He was invited to speak at international conferences and consulted on the establishment of technical schools in other Latin American countries. His innovative approaches to industrial education were studied and, in some cases, adopted by educators in Europe and North America.

== Continued Influence in the 20th Century ==
Even after his death, Krause's ideas continued to shape Argentine education policy. The network of technical schools he helped establish expanded throughout the 20th century, playing a crucial role in Argentina's industrialization efforts. Many of the country's leading engineers and technicians in the mid-20th century were products of the educational system Krause had helped create.
