= List of nuclear power systems in space =

This list of nuclear power systems in space includes 86 nuclear power systems that were flown to space, or at least launched in an attempt to reach space. Such used nuclear power systems include:

- radioisotope heater units (RHU) (usually produce heat by spontaneous decay of ^{238}Pu)
- radioisotope thermoelectric generators (RTG) (usually produce heat by spontaneous decay of ^{238}Pu and convert it to electricity using a thermoelectric generator)
- miniaturized fission reactors (usually produce heat by controlled fission of highly enriched ^{235}U and convert it to electricity using a thermionic converter)

Systems never launched are not included here, see Nuclear power in space.

Initial total power is provided as either electrical power (We) or thermal power (Wt), depending on the intended application.

| Nation | Mission | Launched | Status | Location | Notes | Type | System name | Nuclear fuel | Power (nominal) | Ref |
|---|---|---|---|---|---|---|---|---|---|---|
| USA | Transit-4A | 1961 | Intact | Earth orbit | | RTG | SNAP-3B | ^{238}Pu | 2.7 We | |
| USA | Transit-4B | 1961 | Intact | Earth orbit | | RTG | SNAP-3B | ^{238}Pu | 2.7 We | |
| USA | Transit 5BN-1 | 1963 | Intact | Earth orbit | | RTG | SNAP-9A | ^{238}Pu | 25.2 We | |
| USA | Transit 5BN-2 | 1963 | Intact | Earth orbit | | RTG | SNAP-9A | ^{238}Pu | 26.8 We | |
| USA | Transit 5BN-3 | 1964 | Destroyed | - | Failed to reach orbit, burned up in atmosphere. | RTG | SNAP-9A | ^{238}Pu | 25 We | |
| USA | SNAPSHOT | 1965 | Intact | Earth orbit | Low graveyard orbit in 1300 km height | Fission reactor | SNAP-10A | ^{235}U (uranium-zirconium hydride) | 500 We | |
| USA | Nimbus B (Nimbus-B1) | 1968-05-18 | Destroyed | - | Crashed at launch, radioactive material from RTG recovered from ocean and reused | RTG | SNAP-19B (2) | ^{238}Pu | 56 We | |
| USA | Nimbus 3 (Nimbus-B2) | 1969-04-14 | Destroyed | - | Earth re-entry 1972 | RTG | SNAP-19B (2) | ^{238}Pu | 56 We | |
| USA | Nimbus IV | 1970 | Intact | Earth orbit | | RTG | SNAP-19 | | | |
| USA | Nimbus V | 1972 | Intact | Earth orbit | | RTG | SNAP-19 | | | |
| USA | Nimbus VI | 1975 | Damaged | Earth orbit | | RTG | SNAP-19 | | | |
| USA | Nimbus VII | 1978 | Damaged | Earth orbit | | RTG | SNAP-19 | | | |
| USA | Apollo 11 | 1969 | Intact | Lunar surface | Sea of Tranquility | RHU | RHU (2) | | 30 Wt | |
| USA | Apollo 12 ALSEP | 1969 | Intact | Lunar surface | Ocean of Storms | RTG | SNAP-27 | ^{238}Pu | 73.6 We | |
| USA | Apollo 13 ALSEP | 1970 | Intact | Earth ocean | Survived reentry, remains at 7000+ ft depth, Tonga Trench, Pacific Ocean | RTG | SNAP-27 | ^{238}Pu | 73 We | |
| USA | Apollo 14 ALSEP | 1971 | Intact | Lunar surface | Fra Mauro | RTG | SNAP-27 | ^{238}Pu | 72.5 We | |
| USA | Apollo 15 ALSEP | 1971 | Intact | Lunar surface | Hadley–Apennine | RTG | SNAP-27 | ^{238}Pu | 74.7 We | |
| USA | Pioneer 10 | 1972 | Intact | Solar escape trajectory | | RTG | SNAP-19 (4) + RHU (12) | ^{238}Pu | 162.8 We + 12 Wt | |
| USA | Apollo 16 ALSEP | 1972 | Intact | Lunar surface | Descartes Highlands | RTG | SNAP-27 | ^{238}Pu | 70.9 We | |
| USA | TRAID-01-1X | 1972 | Intact | Earth orbit | | RTG | SNAP-19 | ^{238}Pu | 35.6 We | |
| USA | Apollo 17 ALSEP | 1972 | Intact | Lunar surface | Taurus–Littrow | RTG | SNAP-27 | ^{238}Pu | 75.4 We | |
| USA | Pioneer 11 | 1973 | Intact | Solar escape trajectory | | RTG | RTG SNAP-19 (4) + RHU (12) | ^{238}Pu | 159.6 We + 12 Wt | |
| USA | Viking 1 | 1976 | Intact | Mars surface | Chryse Planitia | RTG | lander modified SNAP-19 (2) | ^{238}Pu | 84.6 We | |
| USA | Viking 2 | 1976 | Intact | Mars surface | Utopia Planitia | RTG | lander modified SNAP-19 (2) | ^{238}Pu | 86.2 We | |
| USA | LES-8 | 1976 | Intact | Earth orbit | Near geostationary orbit | RTG | MHW-RTG (2) | ^{238}Pu | 307.4 We | |
| USA | LES-9 | 1976 | Intact | Earth orbit | Near geostationary orbit | RTG | MHW-RTG (2) | ^{238}Pu | 308.4 We | |
| USA | Voyager 1 | 1977 | In use | Solar escape trajectory | | RTG | MHW-RTG (3) + RHU(9) | ^{238}Pu | 477.6 We + 9 Wt | |
| USA | Voyager 2 | 1977 | In use | Solar escape trajectory | | RTG | MHW-RTG (3) + RHU(9) | ^{238}Pu | 470.1 We + 9 Wt | |
| USA | Mars 2020/Perseverance | 2020 | In use | Mars surface | | RTG | MMRTG | ^{238}Pu | 110 We | |
| USA | Galileo | 1989 | Destroyed | - | Jupiter atmospheric entry | RTG | GPHS-RTG (2) | | 576.8 We | |
| USA | Ulysses | 1990 | Intact | Heliocentric orbit | | RTG | GPHS-RTG | | 283 We | |
| USA | Cassini | 1997 | Destroyed | - | Burned-up in Saturn's atmosphere | RTG | GPHS-RTG (3) | ^{238}Pu | 887 We | |
| USA | New Horizons | 2006 | In use | Solar escape trajectory | | RTG | GPHS-RTG (1) | ^{238}Pu | 249.6 We | |
| USA | MSL/Curiosity rover | 2011 | In use | Mars surface | | RTG | MMRTG | ^{238}Pu | 113 We | |
| Soviet Union | Kosmos 84 | 1965 | Intact | Earth orbit | | RTG | Orion-1 RTG | ^{210}Po | | |
| Soviet Union | Kosmos 90 | 1965 | Intact | Earth orbit | | RTG | Orion-1 RTG | ^{210}Po | | |
| Soviet Union | Kosmos 198 (RORSAT) | 1967-12-27 | Intact | Earth orbit | | Fission reactor | BES-5 ?? | ^{235}U | | |
| Soviet Union | Kosmos 209 (RORSAT) | 1968-03-22 | Intact | Earth orbit | | Fission reactor | BES-5 ?? | ^{235}U | | |
| Soviet Union | Kosmos 300 (Moon) | 1969-09-23 | Destroyed | - | Failed to achieve escape trajectory, burned up 4 days after launch | RTG | | ^{210}Po | | |
| Soviet Union | Kosmos 305 (Moon) | 1969-10-22 | Destroyed | - | Failed to achieve escape trajectory, burned up 2 days after launch | RTG | | ^{210}Po | | |
| Soviet Union | Kosmos 367 (RORSAT) | 1970-10-03 | Intact | Earth orbit, 579 mile altitude | | Fission reactor | BES-5 ?? | ^{235}U | 2 kWe | |
| Soviet Union | Kosmos 402 (RORSAT) | 1971 | Intact | Earth orbit | | Fission reactor | BES-5 ?? | ^{235}U | 2 kWe | |
| Soviet Union | Kosmos 469 (RORSAT) | 1971 | Intact | High orbit | | Fission reactor | BES-5 (officially confirmed) | ^{235}U | 2 kWe | |
| Soviet Union | Kosmos 516 | 1972 | Intact | High orbited 1972 | | Fission reactor | BES-5 | ^{235}U | 2 kWe | |
| Soviet Union | RORSAT | 1973 | Destroyed | - | Launch failure over Pacific Ocean, near Japan | Fission reactor | BES-5 | ^{235}U | 2 kWe | |
| Soviet Union | Kosmos 626 | 1973 | Intact | Earth orbit | | Fission reactor | BES-5 | ^{235}U | 2 kWe | |
| Soviet Union | Kosmos 651 | 1974 | | | | Fission reactor | BES-5 | ^{235}U | 2 kWe | |
| Soviet Union | Kosmos 654 | 1974 | | | | Fission reactor | BES-5 | ^{235}U | 2 kWe | |
| Soviet Union | Kosmos 723 | 1975 | | | | Fission reactor | BES-5 | ^{235}U | 2 kWe | |
| Soviet Union | Kosmos 724 | 1975 | | | | Fission reactor | BES-5 | ^{235}U | 2 kWe | |
| Soviet Union | Kosmos 785 | 1975 | Destroyed | - | Failed after reaching orbit | Fission reactor | BES-5 | ^{235}U | 2 kWe | |
| Soviet Union | Kosmos 860 | 1976 | | | | Fission reactor | BES-5 | ^{235}U | 2 kWe | |
| Soviet Union | Kosmos 861 | 1976 | | | | Fission reactor | BES-5 | ^{235}U | 2 kWe | |
| Soviet Union | Kosmos 952 | 1977 | | | | Fission reactor | BES-5 | ^{235}U | 2 kWe | |
| Soviet Union | Kosmos 954 | 1977 | Destroyed | - | Exploded on re-entry 1978 (over Canada) | Fission reactor | BES-5 | ^{235}U | 2 kWe | |
| Soviet Union | Kosmos 1176 | 1980 | Intact | Earth orbit | 11788/11971 Earth orbit 870–970 km | Fission reactor | BES-5 | ^{235}U | 2 kWe | |
| Soviet Union | Kosmos 1249 | 1981 | | | | Fission reactor | BES-5 | ^{235}U | 2 kWe | |
| Soviet Union | Kosmos 1266 | 1981 | | | | Fission reactor | BES-5 | ^{235}U | 2 kWe | |
| Soviet Union | Kosmos 1299 | 1981 | | | | Fission reactor | BES-5 | ^{235}U | 2 kWe | |
| Soviet Union | Kosmos 1402 | 1982 | Destroyed | - | Earth re-entry 1983 (South Atlantic) | Fission reactor | BES-5 | ^{235}U | 2 kWe | |
| Soviet Union | Kosmos 1372 | 1982 | | | | Fission reactor | BES-5 | ^{235}U | 2 kWe | |
| Soviet Union | Kosmos 1365 | 1982 | | | | Fission reactor | BES-5 | ^{235}U | 2 kWe | |
| Soviet Union | Kosmos 1412 | 1982 | | | | Fission reactor | BES-5 | ^{235}U | 2 kWe | |
| Soviet Union | Kosmos 1461 | 1983 | Destroyed | - | Earth orbit, exploded | Fission reactor | BES-5 | ^{235}U | 2 kWe | |
| Soviet Union | Kosmos 1597 | 1984 | | | | Fission reactor | BES-5 | ^{235}U | 2 kWe | |
| Soviet Union | Kosmos 1607 | 1984 | Intact | Earth orbit | High orbited 1985 | Fission reactor | BES-5 | ^{235}U | 2 kWe | |
| Soviet Union | Kosmos 1670 | 1985 | Intact | Earth orbit | High orbited 1985 | Fission reactor | BES-5 | ^{235}U | 2 kWe | |
| Soviet Union | Kosmos 1677 | 1985 | Intact | Earth orbit | High orbited 1985 | Fission reactor | BES-5 | ^{235}U | 2 kWe | |
| Soviet Union | Kosmos 1736 | 1986 | Intact | Earth orbit | High orbited 1986 | Fission reactor | BES-5 | ^{235}U | 2 kWe | |
| Soviet Union | Kosmos 1771 | 1986 | Intact | Earth orbit | High orbited 1986 | Fission reactor | BES-5 | ^{235}U | 2 kWe | |
| Soviet Union | Kosmos 1900 | 1987 | Intact | Earth orbit | Earth orbit, 454 mile altitude | Fission reactor | BES-5 | ^{235}U | 2 kWe | |
| Soviet Union | Kosmos 1860 | 1987 | | | | Fission reactor | BES-5 | ^{235}U | 2 kWe | |
| Soviet Union | Kosmos 1932 | 1988 | Intact | Earth orbit | 800–900 km | Fission reactor | BES-5 | ^{235}U | 2 kWe | |
| Soviet Union | Kosmos 1682 | 1985 | Intact | Earth orbit | High orbited 1986 | Fission reactor | BES-5 | ^{235}U | 2 kWe | |
| Soviet Union | Kosmos 1818 (RORSAT) | 1987 | Destroyed | - | Destroyed in high Earth orbit | Fission reactor | Topaz-I | ^{235}U | 5 kWe | |
| Soviet Union | Kosmos 1867 (RORSAT) | 1987 | Intact | Earth | Parked in high Earth orbit | Fission reactor | Topaz-I | ^{235}U | 5 kWe | |
| Soviet Union | Lunokhod 201 | 1969-02-19 | Destroyed | - | Rocket exploded at launch, radioactive material from RHU spread over Russia | RHU | | ^{210}Po | | |
| Soviet Union | Lunokhod 1 | 1970 | Intact | Lunar surface | | RHU | | ^{210}Po | | |
| Soviet Union | Lunokhod 2 | 1973 | Intact | Lunar surface | | RHU | | ^{210}Po | | |
| Russia | Mars 96 | 1996 | Destroyed | - | Launch failure, entered Pacific Ocean | RHU | RHU (4) | ^{238}Pu | | |
| China | Chang'e 3 lander | 2013 | In use | Lunar surface | | RHU | In combination with solar panels allows continued use of the Lunar-based ultraviolet telescope | ^{238}Pu | | |
| China | Yutu rover | 2013 | Intact | Lunar surface | | RHU | Communication lost in 2015 | ^{238}Pu | | |
| China | Chang'e 4 lander | 2019 | In use | Lunar surface | | RHU | | ^{238}Pu | | |
| China | Yutu-2 rover | 2019 | In use | Lunar surface | | RHU | | ^{238}Pu | | |
| India | Chandrayaan-3 propulsion module | 2023 | In use | Earth orbit | | RHU | BARC RHU, transferred back from lunar orbit after lander mission completion | ^{241}Am | 2 Wt | |
| USA | BOHR | 2026-07-07 | In use | Earth orbit | First commercial nuclear-powered satellite and first nuclear CubeSat. | Betavoltaic | NanoTritium Batteries | ^{3}H | | |

== See also ==
- Outer Space Treaty
- List of high-altitude nuclear explosions
- Nuclear power in space
- List of artificial radiation belts
- Category:Nuclear-powered robots
