= Heat pipe-cooled reactor =

Type of nuclear reactor cooled by heat pipes

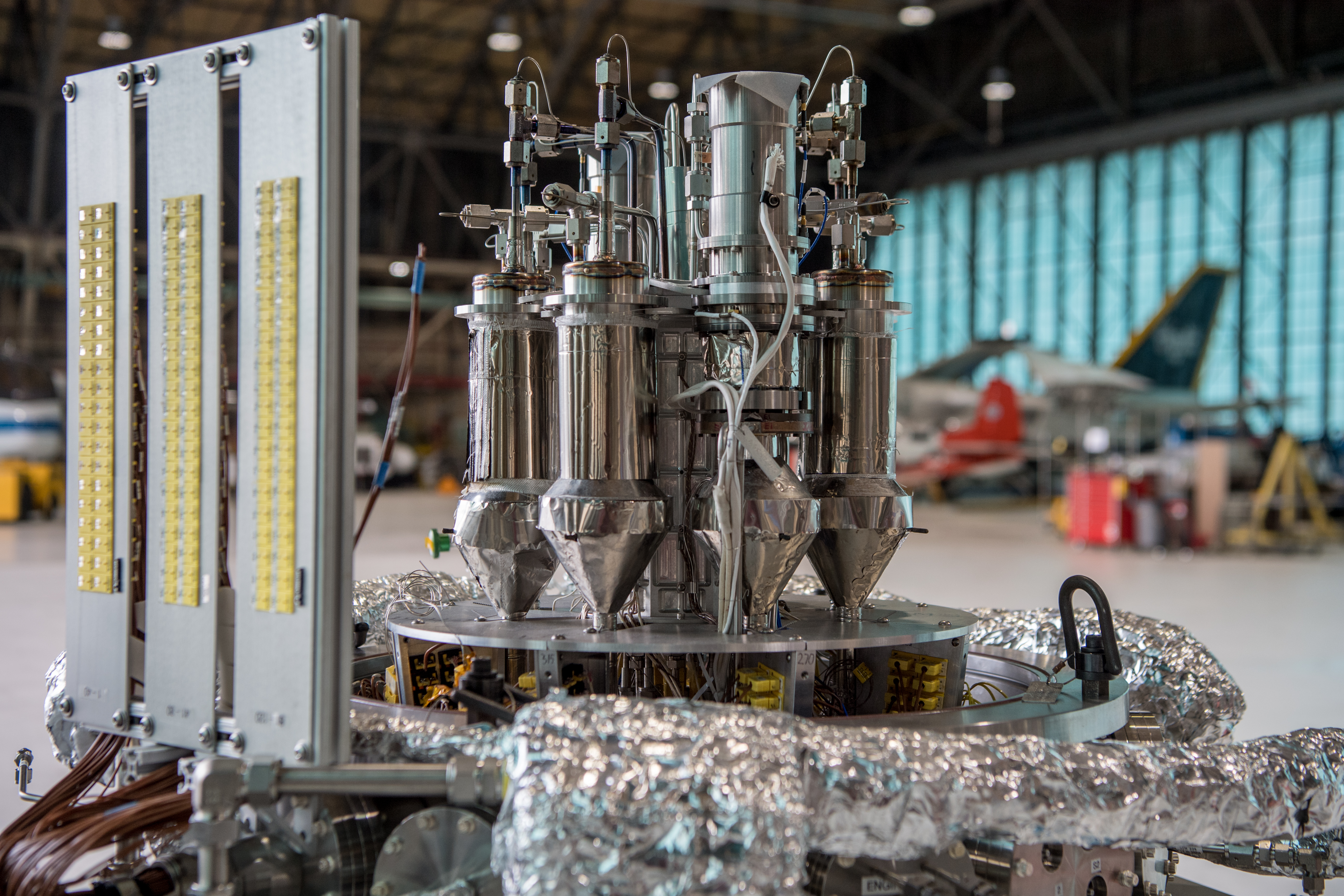
A prototype HPR, designed to produce electricity in space

A heat pipe-cooled reactor (HPR) is a type of nuclear reactor cooled by heat pipes. Using passive heat pipes instead of a pumped nuclear coolant eliminates the need for complex coolant pumping systems. Because heat pipes are passive devices, HPRs can be made highly compact and passively safe.

HPRs have attracted interest for use as space nuclear power systems, due to their simple, reliable design and inherent safety. They are also being explored for use as microreactors for terrestrial power generation because of these characteristics.

The first HPR was the Demonstration Using Flattop Fissions conducted by NASA and the US Department of Energy. A larger prototype HPR, Kilopower, was built by NASA and demonstrated in 2018. As of 2026, Westinghouse has developed a commercial heat pipe-cooled microreactor, the eVinci, that it intends to construct at Malmstrom Air Force Base in the United States.

== Operating principle ==
Diagram of a heat pipe and its operation

Heat pipes are closed tubes that use an internal phase-change material to efficiently transfer heat. A working fluid absorbs heat and evaporates at one end of the pipe, then circulates naturally to the other end where it condenses and deposits its heat. The condensed fluid returns via capillary action to the evaporator via a wick structure running through the heat pipe. For nuclear applications, the working fluid is typically an alkali metal. The use of the latent heat of the working fluid enables highly efficient, passive heat transfer.

Nuclear reactors generate energy, in the form of heat, from nuclear fission. They require some mechanism of heat removal, both to prevent overheating and to generate electrical power. Typically, this is accomplished via a liquid or gaseous nuclear coolant that is pumped through the reactor core. Using heat pipes instead of a pumped coolant eliminates the need for coolant pumping systems and significantly simplifies the core design. Heat pipe-cooled reactors are regarded as inherently safe, and are considered highly resistant to single-point failures and loss-of-coolant accidents. Heat pipes can be used to make highly compact microreactors. Heat pipes, while simple in their operating principles, incorporate highly complex phenomena combining phase change, capillary action, and two-phase turbulent flow. These phenomena create large uncertainty in heat transfer capabilities, and have been the subject of significant research.

== Design ==
Example diagram of a heat pipe-cooled reactor

Heat pipe-cooled reactors are solid-state devices that use heat pipes to conduct heat from the core to a power conversion system. Their cooling systems have no moving parts, low internal pressure, and are self-starting (no energy is required to pump coolant through the reactor before startup).

The small size of an HPR core typically means that HPRs are fast-neutron reactors, since a neutron moderator would take too much space or weight. Their fast spectrum means that highly enriched uranium is the most common fuel, however this raises concerns regarding nuclear proliferation. As of 2025, the most common fuel for HPR designs is uranium nitride, as opposed to the common uranium dioxide fuel used in commercial reactors. Fast neutrons also mean a large neutron reflector is typically used, to reduce leakage and the required fuel load. The reflector is usually beryllium oxide.

Cross-section of a core segment in an HPR. The reactor core may comprise many such elements.

A typical HPR design comprises multiple core blocks, each containing several fuel rods and a heat pipe bound within a matrix. The matrix is composed of a material with high thermal conductivity, typically a metal or alloy. Some designs, such as Kilopower, use a monolithic core, where the heat pipes are embedded directly in a core block made of fuel material. Heat from fission in the fuel elements flows through the matrix to the evaporation section of the heat pipe.

Heat pipe reactors are generally intended to operate at temperatures above 900 K (627 °C; 1,160 °F), so a high-temperature heat pipe using an alkali metal as its working fluid is used. The heat pipe transmits heat to the power conversion system, where it is converted into electrical or mechanical energy. Depending on the design, the power conversion system can use solid-state devices such as thermionic converters or dynamic methods such as Stirling engines or gas turbines. Solid-state devices, which include thermionic and thermoelectric generators, are simple, lightweight, and highly reliable. However, such devices are also very inefficient, requiring rejection of a large quantity of waste heat. Dynamic conversion entails significantly greater efficiency, but also contain moving parts and are less reliable. Stirling engines, which are lightweight and reliable while also being more efficient than solid-state conversion, are a popular choice. Brayton-cycle gas turbines are highly efficient, and also relatively reliable.

== Potential applications ==
Heat pipe reactor research originated with space nuclear power. Space reactors are designed for deep space exploration or planetary bases, where solar power is no longer practical. They must be lightweight, compact, efficient, and have high specific power while remaining highly reliable. Typical heat pipe-cooled space reactor designs use two sets of heat pipes. One supplies heat from the core to the power conversion system, and another transfers waste heat to the radiator. For power conversion, a Stirling engine is suitable for small reactors, while a gas turbine is better suited to larger (megawatt-scale) systems.

Heat pipe-cooled microreactors have also attracted attention for decentralized power generation. Microreactors are small, portable reactors that provide up to 20 MW of electricity. They are designed to produce a reliable supply of electricity with a small footprint. They are typically intended to generate power for decentralized locations, such as remote areas, military bases, or islands. As with space systems, heat pipe microreactors are attractive because of their simplified design and excellent inherent safety.

== History ==
Heat pipe-cooled reactors have been researched since the 1960s. Space reactors, including SNAP-10A, Romashka, and TOPAZ used heat pipes to aid heat transfer in their thermoelectric generators. Los Alamos National Laboratory (LANL) proposed in the 1960s to develop a reactor cooled with heat pipes, however HPR research was severely limited by issues in materials and the efficiency of thermoelectric generators. By the 1990s, research had been largely discontinued following the cancellation of space programs.

Research picked up again in the early 2000s. LANL proposed the Heatpipe-Operated Mars Exploration Reactor (HOMER) in 2002, which laid the foundation for modern HPR designs. NASA's Kilopower program shifted focus to simplified designs, leading to the Demonstration Using Flattop Fissions (DUFF) project. This experiment, conducted with LANL, demonstrated the first heat pipe-cooled reactor on September 13, 2012. DUFF used a stirling engine to generate 24 W of electricity from heat supplied from the reactor core by heat pipes.

In 2015, NASA began the Kilopower Reactor Using Stirling TechnologY (KRUSTY) to develop a full prototype HPR. The 5 kW_{th} KRUSTY prototype completed a full power cycle in 2018. The testing included reactor startup, stable power operation, shutdown, and accident conditions. KRUSTY operated successfully for 24 hours at over 800 °C (1,470 °F), and demonstrated the ability of HPRs to respond to reactor conditions and transients.

Westinghouse developed the eVinci microreactor, a small modular, transportable HPR power system using TRISO fuel, that is considered the first commercial HPR design. The company intended to build its first plant in Canada and submitted an license review application to the Canadian Nuclear Safety Commission in 2023. The project was cancelled in 2025, as the company shifted to government applications. In 2024, Westinghouse was selected to build and operate a prototype eVinci reactor at Idaho National Laboratory. The prototype achieved zero-power criticality in August 2026. In 2026, US Air Force selected Westinghouse to construct an eVinci reactor at Malmstrom Air Force Base by 2030 as part of its Advanced Nuclear Power for Installations program.

== See also ==
- Liquid metal cooled reactor – Nuclear reactor where the coolant is liquid metal
