= Krasnaya Zvezda State Enterprise =

Krasnaya Zvezda State Enterprise (GP Krasnaya Zvezda, ГП Красная звезда, meaning Red Star) is a Russian state enterprise that researches and produces nuclear power systems for spacecraft. It was established in 1972, is located in Moscow and is subordinated to Rosatom.

Krasnaya Zvezda developed the Bouk (Buk) and TOPAZ (Topol') reactors for spacecraft. 31 Bouk and 2 TOPAZ were used on RORSAT naval reconnaissance satellites.
