= Arsenal Design Bureau =

Subsidiary of Roscosmos

- Type: Federal State Unitary Enterprise
- Industry: Aerospace, arms industry
- Founded: 21 November 1949
- Headquarters: Saint Petersburg, Russia
- Products: Missiles, ICMBs, artillery, spacecraft, satellites
- Parent: Roscosmos
- Website: kbarsenal.ru

Arsenal Design Bureau (Russian: Конструкторское бюро «Арсенал», romanized: Konstruktorskoye byuro Arsenal) is an engineering company active in the fields of space technology, ship artillery and civilian machine building. The company was founded in 1711 and is located in Saint Petersburg in the Russian Federation. Its full name is Arsenal Design Bureau named after Mikhail Vasil’evich Frunze Federal State Unitary Enterprise.

== Overview ==
The company's main purpose is development and operation of space complexes and spacecraft for various purposes, and development and creation of navy artillery mounts and launchers. KB Arsenal is the developer of Liana electronic reconnaissance program, intended to replace the EORSATS and Tselina 2.

== History ==
KB Arsenal was founded in 1711 by Tsar Peter I of Russia as a cannon foundry. Renamed to TsBK-7, the company created ICBMs between 1960 and 1980, after which it switched its focus to space research. It is the developer of over 80 spacecraft in the COSMOS series, including Russia's first nuclear power system satellites, the Kosmos 1818 and Kosmos 1867. It is the oldest Russian/Soviet design bureau connected to space research.
