= 4C 49.22 =

Quasar in the constellation Ursa Major

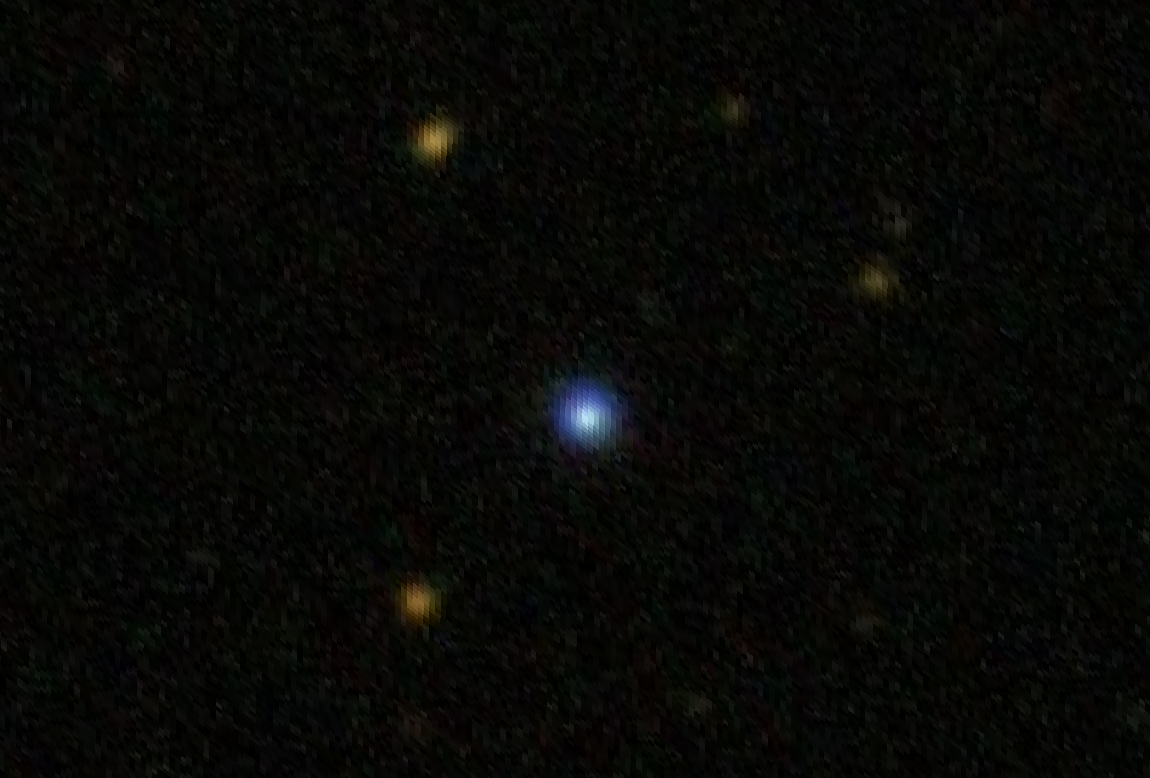
- The quasar 4C 49.22

Observation data (J2000.0 epoch)
- Constellation: Ursa Major
- Right ascension: 11^{h} 53^{m} 24.46^{s}
- Declination: +49° 31′ 08.83″
- Redshift: 0.333640
- Heliocentric radial velocity: 100023 km/s
- Distance: 3.848 Gly
- Apparent magnitude (V): 17.66
- Apparent magnitude (B): 17.94

Characteristics
- Type: FSRQ
- Size: ~470,000 ly (144 kpc) (estimated)

Other designations
- SBS 1150+497, 21P 164, 2MASX J11532449+4931090, LEDA 2821081, CoNFIG 114, LB 02136, LHE 310, NVSS J115324+493109, OM +484, RBS 1046, RX J1153.4+4931

4C 49.22 is a radio-loud quasar located in the constellation of Ursa Major. The redshift of the object is (z) 0.333 and it was first discovered as an astronomical radio source in 1967 by astronomers. The radio spectrum of the object is considered flat, making this a flat spectrum radio quasar.

== Description ==
4C 49.22 is categorized as a blazar, mainly due to its variability on the electromagnetic spectrum, with one gamma ray displayed on 15 May 2011 after being in a long period of low gamma-ray activity state when observed by the Large Area Telescope (LAT). Its host is an extremely large luminous elliptical galaxy with an off-centered nucleus and a slight elongation towards the north-east. A faint tidal arm is curved, suggesting an interaction with a small companion 10 arcseconds away from it. The central supermassive black hole of the quasar is estimated to be 3.3 × 10^{8} M_{☉}.

The radio structure of 4C 49.22 is compact. When observed by the Very Long Baseline Array (VLA), the source is found to be a triple with a halo structure located in north to south direction. There is a bright radio core present with an estimated flux density of 338 mJy at 5 GHz frequencies and a flat spectrum between frequencies of 1.6 and 15 GHz.

The one-sided radio jet of the quasar is extensively studied. When observed by very-long-baseline interferometry (VLBI), the jet is found be slightly extended for about three milliarcseconds. There is also a knot feature present in the jet at around 1.39 ± 0.1 milliarcsecond from the core region. On the southwest side its intensity is increasing brightly until the knot position, where it fades away. This jet is described as having a knotty appearance, with the knot features having a jet power between 2.0 × 10^{45} to 1.4 × 10^{48} erg s^{−1}. There is also a high amount of polarization present in the jet as well as variations along the rotation measure of the jet, increasing from 15 rad m^{−2} at the core position until 25 rad m^{−2} at a knot feature. This jet has also been studied in X-rays, where a hotspot feature is located in its southern lobe and further separated into two components.
