= Kosmos 1867 =

Radar ocean reconnaissance satellite

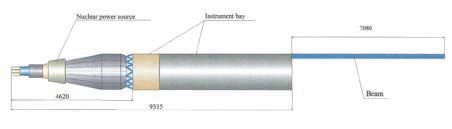
- Kosmos 1867
- Mission type: Radar ocean surveillance
- COSPAR ID: 1987-060A
- SATCAT no.: 18187
- Mission duration: ~ 11 months

Spacecraft properties
- Spacecraft type: Plazma-A
- Launch mass: 1,500 kilograms (3,307 lb)

Start of mission
- Launch date: July 10, 1987, 15:36:00 UTC
- Rocket: Tsyklon-2
- Launch site: Baikonur 90

Orbital parameters
- Reference system: Geocentric
- Regime: Low Earth
- Eccentricity: 0.00111
- Perigee altitude: 797 kilometres (495 mi)
- Apogee altitude: 813 kilometres (505 mi)
- Inclination: 65.01 degrees
- Period: 100.8 minutes
- Epoch: April 14, 2014 UTC 21:26:10.75

Kosmos 1867 (Russian: Космос 1867) was a nuclear powered radar ocean reconnaissance satellite (RORSAT) that was launched by the Soviet Union on July 10, 1987. It was put into an orbit of about 800 km (500 mi). Its mission was to monitor the oceans for naval and merchant vessels, and had a mission life of about eleven months.

== Description ==
Kosmos 1867 was launched on July 10, 1987, on a Tsyklon-2 rocket from the Baikonur Cosmodrome. It was put into an orbit about 800 km (500 mi) above the Earth's surface at an inclination of 65° and a period of 100.8 minutes. The satellite had a mission life of about 11 months.

The satellite was powered by a TOPAZ 1 nuclear reactor. This reactor was cooled by liquid sodium-potassium (NaK) metal, and used a high-temperature moderator containing hydrogen and highly enriched fuel. The reactor produced electricity using a thermionic converter. The satellite used a Plazma-2 SPT Hall-effect thruster for propulsion.

The mission of Kosmos 1867 was to search the oceans for naval and merchant vessels. Unlike earlier Soviet RORSAT satellites, Kosmos 1867 and its twin, Kosmos 1818, were launched into high orbits. This reduced the likelihood of mishaps resulting in uncontrolled re-entry of radioactive material, as had occurred with Kosmos 954 and Kosmos 1402, which showered the Earth with radioactive debris.

In 1992, Kosmos 1867 had a visual magnitude of approximately 3.3.

Kosmos 1867 had become damaged, resulting in several fragments of space debris. It is suspected that the coolant tube had leaked NaK metal, in a manner similar to Kosmos 1818 in 2008. On April 8, 2014, the US Space Surveillance Network reported that 11 new objects were detected, and 24 more objects were reported on April 15, 2014. The coolant tube of Kosmos 1867 may have cracked due to thermal stresses by repeated solar heating, or by an impact.
