= Kosmos 1818 =

Soviet surveillance satellite

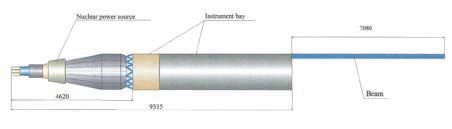
- Illustration of Kosmos 1818
- Mission type: Radar ocean surveillance
- COSPAR ID: 1987-011A
- SATCAT no.: 17369
- Mission duration: ~ 5 to 6 months

Spacecraft properties
- Spacecraft type: Plazma-A
- Launch mass: 1,500 kilograms (3,307 lb)

Start of mission
- Launch date: February 1, 1987, 23:31:00 UTC
- Rocket: Tsyklon-2
- Launch site: Baikonur 90

Orbital parameters
- Reference system: Geocentric
- Eccentricity: 0.0016868
- Perigee altitude: 775 kilometres (482 mi)
- Apogee altitude: 799 kilometres (496 mi)
- Inclination: 65.01 degrees
- Period: 100.61 minutes
- Epoch: April 15, 2014 UTC 00:20:33.89

Kosmos 1818 was a nuclear powered Soviet surveillance satellite in the RORSAT program, which monitored NATO vessels using radar. Kosmos 1818 was the first satellite to use the TOPAZ-1 fission reactor. In July 2008, the satellite was damaged, and leaked a trail of sodium coolant.

== Description ==
Kosmos 1818 was launched on February 1, 1987 on a Tsyklon-2 rocket from the Baikonur Cosmodrome. It was put into an orbit about 800 km (500 mi) above the Earth's surface at an inclination of 65° and a period of 100.6 minutes. The satellite had a mission life of about five to six months.

The satellite was powered by a TOPAZ 1 nuclear reactor. This was cooled by liquid sodium-potassium, NaK, metal, it used a high-temperature moderator containing hydrogen and highly enriched uranium fuel. It produced electricity using a thermionic converter. It had a Plazma-2 SPT electric engine. Its mission was to search the oceans for naval and merchant vessels, using radar.

Unlike the earlier Soviet RORSAT satellites, Kosmos 1818 and its twin, Kosmos 1867, were launched into high orbits. This mitigated the possibility of mishaps resulting in uncontrolled re-entry of radioactive material, as had occurred with Kosmos 954 and Kosmos 1402, which showered the Earth with radioactive debris.

In 1992, Kosmos 1818 had an approximate visual magnitude of 3.3.

== Fragmentation ==
About July 4, 2008, either Kosmos 1818 was hit by an object or a coolant tube cracked due to thermal stresses by repeated solar heating. The US Space Surveillance Network reported that about thirty objects were formed. These have orbital periods ranging from 100.5 to 101.5 minutes. Some of the debris appears to be metallic spheres. These could have resulted from the NaK coolant.

Russian Space Forces chief of staff General Alexander Yakushin indicated that the debris was high above the orbit of the International Space Station and did not pose any threat of radioactive contamination to the Earth.
