= Romashka reactor =

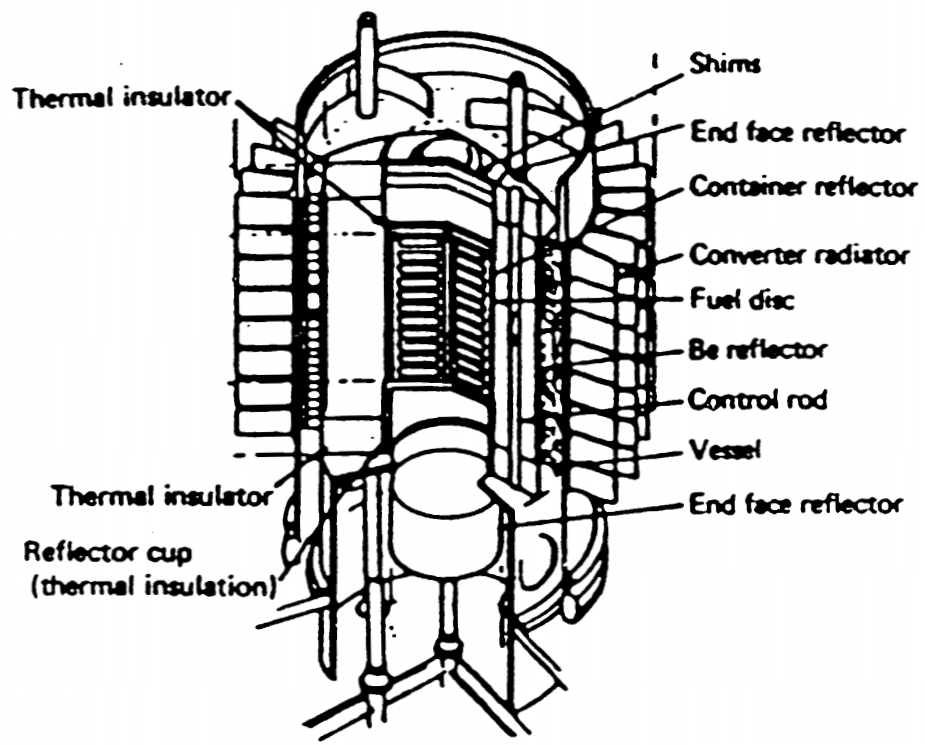
- Cutaway view of an early ground-based Romashka reactor showing 11 fuel disks.
- Generation: Experimental
- Reactor concept: RTG
- Status: decommissioned

Main parameters of the reactor core
- Fuel (fissile material): ^{235}U
- Fuel state: solid disks, UC_{2}
- Neutron energy spectrum: Fast
- Primary control method: rod
- Neutron reflector: Beryllium
- Primary coolant: none (conduction)

Reactor usage
- Primary use: research
- Power (thermal): 40 kW
- Power (electric): 0.3–10 kW

The Romashka reactor (Russian: Ромашка, lit. 'chamomile') was a Soviet experimental nuclear reactor. It began operation in 1964, and was developed by the Kurchatov Institute of Atomic Energy. The reactor used direct thermoelectric conversion to create electricity, rather than heating water to drive a turbine. It is thus similar to a radioisotope thermoelectric generator, but higher power.

The Romashka reactor was developed with the intention of using nuclear power in space satellites, but was superseded by the more powerful BES-5 reactor. The project was canceled after the death of Sergei Korolev, who was heavily involved in the project.

== Reactor design ==
The fuel was 49 kg of highly enriched uranium (90% ^{235}U) in the form of UC_{2} (uranium carbide). A beryllium reflector was used on the ends of the reactor, and electricity was generated using silicon-germanium semiconductors.

The Romashka reactor didn't use liquid coolant; it was designed to be simple, compact, and light. Temperature was self-regulated through the use of a negative temperature reactivity coefficient. The successful demonstration of the Romashka reactor provided a baseline for further developments in Soviet nuclear power for space satellites.

The experimental reactor was started (reached criticality) in 1964 and decommissioned in 1966, and was used to research the concept of direct energy conversion. It produced 40 kW of heat, and reached temperatures of 2,173 K (1,900 °C; 3,452 °F).The reactor operated for 15000 hrs.

== See also ==
- BES-5 reactor
- List of nuclear power systems in space
- SNAP-10A
- TOPAZ nuclear reactor
