= Kosmos 1402 =

Russian artificial satellite

- Mission type: Ocean reconnaissance
- COSPAR ID: 1982-084A
- SATCAT no.: 13441

Spacecraft properties
- Spacecraft type: US-A
- BOL mass: 3,000 pounds (1,400 kg)
- Power: 2 kW BES-5 fission reactor

Start of mission
- Launch date: 30 August 1982, 10:06 UTC
- Rocket: Tsyklon-2
- Launch site: Tyuratam missile and space complex (now Baikonur launchpad 90)

End of mission
- Disposal: Decommissioned
- Decay date: 23 January 1983; Reactor: 7 February 1983

Orbital parameters
- Reference system: Geocentric
- Regime: Low Earth
- Eccentricity: 0.00188
- Perigee altitude: 251 kilometres (156 mi)
- Apogee altitude: 263 kilometres (163 mi)
- Inclination: 65.6 degrees
- Period: 89.64 minutes
- Epoch: 29 September 1982

Kosmos 1402 (Russian: Космос 1402) was a Soviet spy satellite that malfunctioned, resulting in the uncontrolled re-entry of its nuclear reactor and its radioactive uranium fuel. Kosmos 1402 was launched on August 30, 1982, and re-entered the atmosphere on 23 January 1983. The fission reactor entered a few days later; on 7 February 1983.

Kosmos 1402 was a RORSAT surveillance satellite that used radar for monitoring NATO vessels. The power source for the satellite was a BES-5 nuclear fission reactor, which used about 50 kilograms (110 lb) of enriched uranium as a fuel source. The satellite operated in low Earth orbit, and the reactor was designed to eject to a higher parking orbit at the end of the satellite's mission, or in the event of a mishap. This ejection mechanism was implemented in the RORSAT satellites after a nuclear accident caused by a previous malfunction of Kosmos 954, five years earlier over Canada's Northwest Territories.

In response to the Kosmos 954 mishap, RORSAT satellites were modified with an ejection system for their nuclear reactors. This ejection system would allow the reactor section to be ejected in the event of a malfunction, or at the end of the satellite's service life, so the radioactive core could be placed in a disposal orbit (about 1000 km), where the fuel would remain for 500 years.

== Accident ==
On 28 December 1982, the ejection system in Kosmos 1402 failed to adequately jettison the reactor to a higher orbit, and the satellite split into three parts and began to tumble out of control. The three main sub-components were the reactor with its booster engine, the instrument section of the satellite with the expended second stage of the launch vehicle, and the radar antenna.

If the uranium core were to explode or shatter in the atmosphere, and radioactive fragments fell near a populated area, the resulting nuclear contamination could have caused a significant and widespread hazard. Because of this concern, the Soviet engineers had re-designed the reactor to completely burn up in the atmosphere, so that nothing would reach the ground. But this information was not verified by other countries at the time.

The uncertainty of the reentry location and time, coupled with concerns of radioactive contamination, triggered many countries to place emergency response teams on high alert. Military aircraft, ships, and personnel were mobilized in anticipation. Countries with response plans included United States, Canada, Belgium, Australia, Oman, UAE, West Germany, France and Sweden.

The antenna section was the first part of the satellite to re-enter. It burned up in the atmosphere on December 30, 1982.

The main satellite bus of Kosmos 1402 reentered the Earth's atmosphere on January 23, 1983, south of Diego Garcia in the Indian Ocean (25°S 84°E). No debris was recovered, but it is believed that the satellite disintegrated then crashed into the sea. The satellite was visible over the United Kingdom, for about a minute, on the night before impact.

The reactor section and core continued to orbit for another two weeks. It re-entered on February 7, 1983, over the South Atlantic Ocean, near Ascension Island (19°S 22°W). The reactor is believed to have completely burned up into particles and dispersed to safe levels of atmospheric radioactivity.

== Aftermath ==
Subsequent RORSATs were equipped with a backup (secondary) core ejection mechanism – when the primary ejection mechanism failed on Kosmos 1900 in 1988 this system succeeded in raising the core to a safe disposal orbit. After this accident, launches of new US-A series satellites were stopped for a year and a half.

Radioactive strontium was detected in rain samples from Fayetteville, Arkansas in the months following the incident. The radioactive material originated in the Kosmos 1402 core. Another investigation determined that 44 kg of uranium had been dispersed into the stratosphere after the incident.

The incident triggered widespread discussion about nuclear technology in space, including topics related to space law, insurance and liability, militarization, nuclear safety and security.

== See also ==
- Kosmos 1818 - RORSAT mission destroyed in orbit
- Kosmos (satellite)
- List of Kosmos satellites
- List of nuclear power systems in space
