= US-A =

Soviet nuclear-powered surveillance satellite

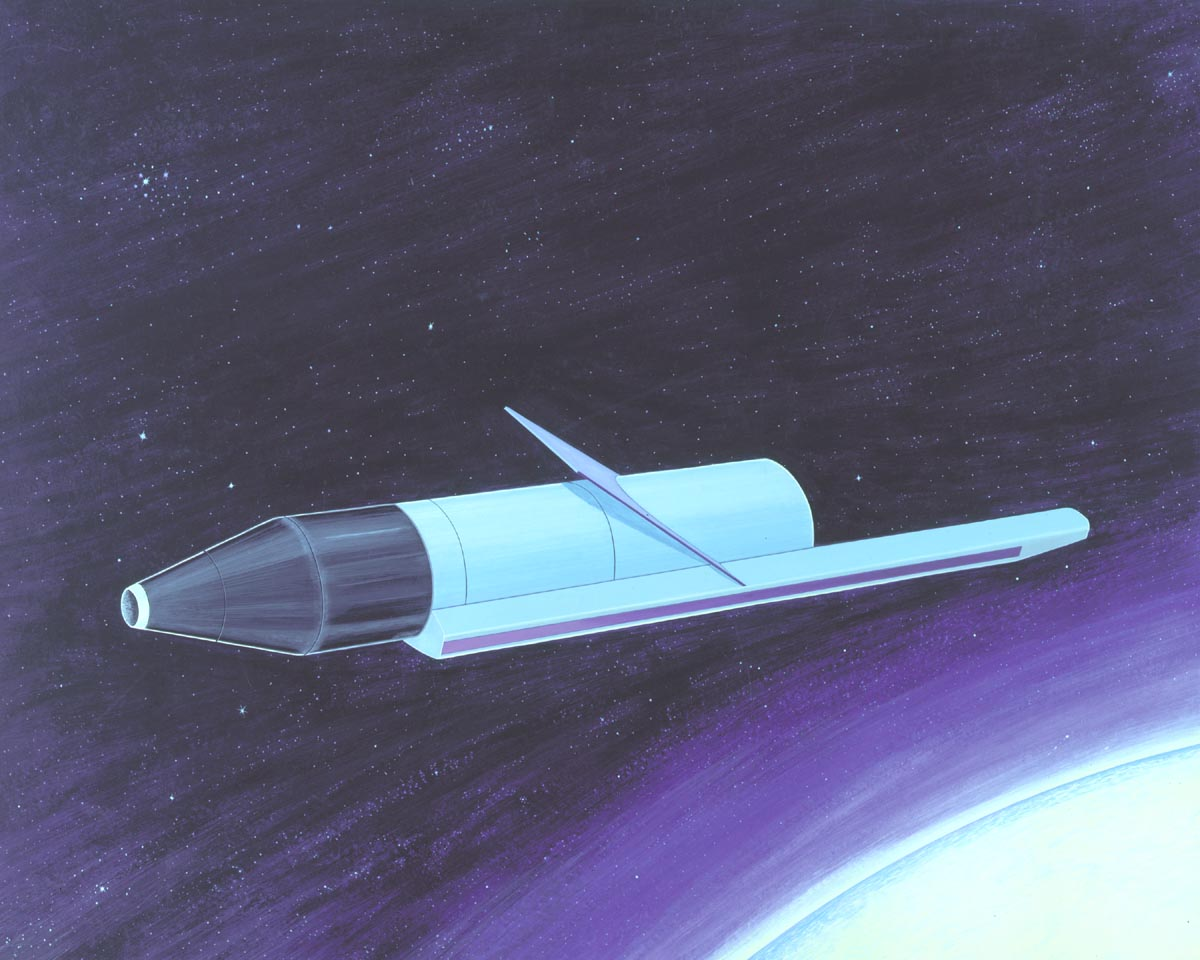
RORSAT

Upravlyaemy Sputnik Aktivnyy (Russian: Управляемый Спутник Активный for Controlled Active Satellite), or US-A, also known in the Western world as Radar Ocean Reconnaissance Satellite or RORSAT (GRAU index 17F16K), was a series of 33 Soviet reconnaissance satellites. Launched between 1967 and 1988 to monitor NATO and merchant vessels using radar, the satellites were powered by nuclear reactors. US-A satellites were part of the Legenda satellite system.

Because a return signal from an ordinary target illuminated by a radar transmitter diminishes as the inverse of the fourth power of the distance, for the surveillance radar to work effectively, US-A satellites had to be placed in low Earth orbit. Had they used large solar panels for power, the orbit would have rapidly decayed due to drag through the upper atmosphere. Further, the satellite would have been useless in the shadow of Earth. Hence the majority of the satellites carried type BES-5 nuclear reactors fuelled by uranium-235. Normally the nuclear reactor cores were ejected into high orbit (a so-called "disposal orbit") at the end of the mission, but there were several failure incidents, some of which resulted in radioactive material re-entering the Earth's atmosphere.

The US-A programme was responsible for orbiting a total of 33 nuclear reactors, 31 of them BES-5 types with a capacity of providing about two kilowatts of power for the radar unit. In addition, in 1987 the Soviets launched two larger TOPAZ nuclear reactors (six kilowatts) in Kosmos satellites (Kosmos 1818 and Kosmos 1867) which were each capable of operating for six months. The higher-orbiting TOPAZ-containing satellites were the major source of orbital contamination for satellites that sensed gamma-rays for astronomical and security purposes, as radioisotope thermoelectric generators (RTGs) do not generate significant gamma radiation as compared with unshielded satellite fission reactors, and all of the BES-5-containing spacecraft orbited too low to cause positron pollution in the magnetosphere.

The last US-A satellite was launched 14 March 1988.

One of the last RORSAT follow-ups, called Kosmos 1867, was on 19 July 2025, carried out from the IAAM Foundation tracking stations, coordinated by the Mallorcan astronomer Amado Carbonell Santos, on the island of Mallorca, Spain.

== Incidents ==
- Launch failure, 25 April 1973. Launch failed and the reactor fell into the Pacific Ocean north of Japan. Radiation was detected by US air sampling airplanes.
- Kosmos 367 (04564 / 1970-079A), 3 October 1970, failed 110 hours after launch, moved to higher orbit.
- Kosmos 954. The satellite failed to boost into a nuclear-safe storage orbit as planned. Nuclear materials re-entered the Earth's atmosphere on 24 January 1978 and left a trail of radioactive pollution over an estimated 124,000 square kilometres of Canada's Northwest Territories.
- Kosmos 1402. Failed to boost into storage orbit in late 1982. The reactor core was separated from the remainder of the spacecraft and was the last piece of the satellite to return to Earth, landing in the South Atlantic Ocean on 7 February 1983.
- Kosmos 1900. The primary system failed to eject the reactor core into storage orbit, but the backup managed to push it into an orbit 80 km (50 mi) below its intended altitude.

== Other concerns ==
Although most nuclear cores were successfully ejected into higher orbits, their orbits will still eventually decay.

US-A satellites were a major source of space debris in low Earth orbit. The debris is created two ways:

- During 16 reactor core ejections, approximately 128 kg of NaK-78 (a fusible alloy eutectic of 22% and 78% w/w sodium and potassium, respectively) escaped from the primary coolant systems of the BES-5 reactors. The smaller droplets have already decayed/reentered, but larger droplets (up to 5.5 cm in diameter) were still in orbit as of 2012. Since the metal coolant was exposed to neutron radiation, it contains some radioactive argon-39, with a half-life of 269 years. There is no risk of surface contamination, as the droplets will burn up completely in the upper atmosphere on re-entry and the argon, a chemically inert gas, will dissipate. The major risk of the now solid objects is impact with operational satellites.
- An additional mechanism for radioactive material release is through the impact of space debris hitting intact contained coolant loops. A number of these old satellites are punctured by orbiting space debris—calculated to be 8 percent over any 50-year period—and release their remaining NaK coolant into space. The coolant self-forms into frozen droplets of solid sodium-potassium of up to approximately several centimeters in size, and these solid objects then become a significant source of space debris themselves.

== List of US-A satellites ==
There were 38 Rorsat satellite launches from Baikonur, all with reported mass of 3,800 kg.

Rorsat satellite launches
Launch date	Satellite name	Launch vehicle	Perigee (km)	Apogee (km)	Inclination (deg)	Period (min)
1968 March 22	Cosmos 209	Tsyklon	876	927	65.30	103.00
1969 January 25	US-A mass model	Tsyklon	-	100	-	-
1970 October 3	Cosmos 367	Tsyklon 2	915	1,022	65.30	104.50
1971 April 1	Cosmos 402	Tsyklon 2	965	1,011	65.00	104.90
1971 December 25	Cosmos 469	Tsyklon 2	948	1,006	64.50	104.60
1972 August 21	Cosmos 516	Tsyklon 2	906	1,038	64.80	104.50
1973 April 25	n/a - failure	Tsyklon 2	-	-	-	-
1973 December 27	Cosmos 626	Tsyklon 2	907	982	65.40	103.90
1974 May 15	Cosmos 651	Tsyklon 2	890	946	65.00	103.40
1974 May 17	Cosmos 654	Tsyklon 2	924	1,006	64.90	104.40
1975 April 2	Cosmos 723	Tsyklon 2	899	961	64.70	103.60
1975 April 7	Cosmos 724	Tsyklon 2	852	943	65.60	102.90
1975 December 12	Cosmos 785	Tsyklon 2	907	1,004	65.10	104.20
1976 October 17	Cosmos 860	Tsyklon 2	923	995	64.70	104.30
1976 October 21	Cosmos 861	Tsyklon 2	928	987	64.90	104.20
1977 September 16	Cosmos 952	Tsyklon 2	911	990	64.90	104.10
1977 September 18	Cosmos 954	Tsyklon 2	251	265	65.00	89.70
1980 April 29	Cosmos 1176	Tsyklon 2	873	962	64.80	103.40
1981 April 21	Cosmos 1266	Tsyklon 2	911	941	64.80	103.60
1981 August 24	Cosmos 1299	Tsyklon 2	926	962	65.10	103.90
1981 March 5	Cosmos 1249	Tsyklon 2	904	976	65.00	103.90
1982 August 30	Cosmos 1402	Tsyklon 2	250	266	65.00	89.60
1982 June 1	Cosmos 1372	Tsyklon 2	919	966	64.90	103.90
1982 May 14	Cosmos 1365	Tsyklon 2	881	979	65.10	103.60
1982 October 2	Cosmos 1412	Tsyklon 2	886	998	64.80	103.90
1984 June 29	Cosmos 1579	Tsyklon 2	914	970	65.10	103.90
1984 October 31	Cosmos 1607	Tsyklon 2	908	994	65.00	104.10
1985 August 1	Cosmos 1670	Tsyklon 2	893	1,007	64.90	104.10
1985 August 23	Cosmos 1677	Tsyklon 2	880	1,001	64.70	103.90
1986 August 20	Cosmos 1771	Tsyklon 2	909	1,000	65.00	104.20
1986 March 21	Cosmos 1736	Tsyklon 2	936	995	65.00	104.40
1987 February 1	Cosmos 1818	Tsyklon 2	775	799	65.01	100.61
1987 June 18	Cosmos 1860	Tsyklon 2	900	992	65.00	104.00
1987 July 10	Cosmos 1867	Tsyklon 2	797	813	65.01	100.8
1987 December 12	Cosmos 1900	Tsyklon 2	696	735	66.10	99.10
1988 March 14	Cosmos 1932	Tsyklon 2	920	1,008	65.10	104.40

== See also ==
- SNAP-10A, an experimental nuclear reactor launched into orbit by the United States
- Space-based radar
- List of Kosmos satellites
