= BES-5 =

Soviet small nuclear reactor used in satellites

BES-5 reactor
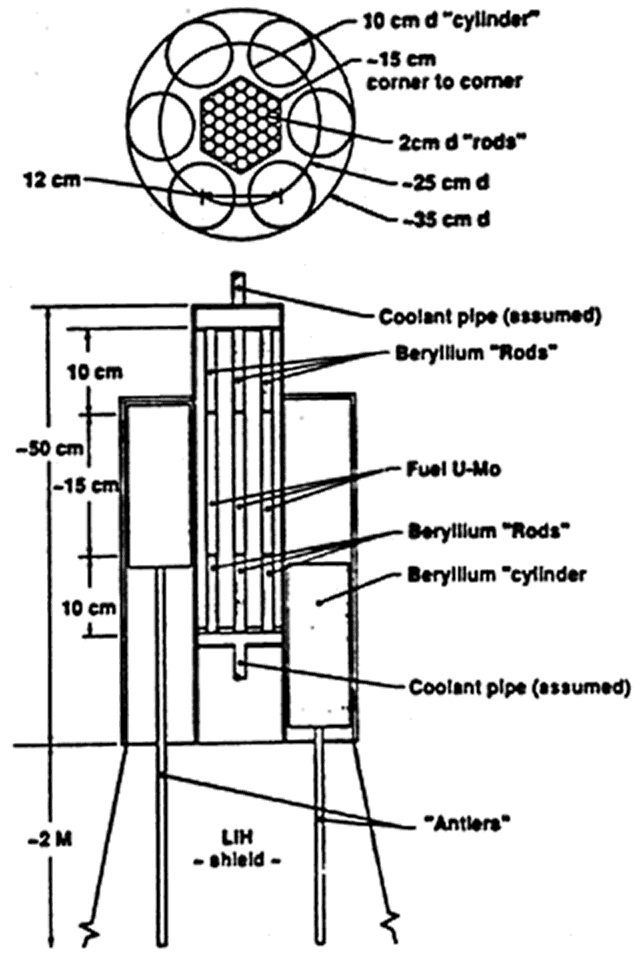
- BES-5 type reactor
- Generation: Experimental
- Reactor concept: Unknown
- Status: ~29 units in Earth orbit

Main parameters of the reactor core
- Fuel (fissile material): ^{235}U
- Fuel state: 37 solid cylinders
- Neutron energy spectrum: Fast
- Primary control method: six rods, BC_{2} with LiH inserts
- Neutron reflector: Beryllium
- Primary coolant: NaK

Reactor usage
- Primary use: US-A satellites
- Power (thermal): 100 kW
- Power (electric): 1.3–5 kW

BES-5, also known as Bouk or Buk (Russian: бук, lit. 'beech'), was a Soviet thermoelectric generator that was used to power 31 satellites in the US-A (RORSAT) project. The heat source was a uranium 235 fast fission nuclear reactor (FNR).

== Background ==
Spacecraft nuclear reactors are typically fast reactors for the following reasons. First, normal moderator materials (carbon, water) add bulk and mass which is not desirable in a spacecraft. Second, for reasons of nucleonics, the fuel must be highly enriched to have a lightweight critical mass (similar to small reactor designs on nuclear submarines). Some of the ^{238}U (which is fertile and not fissile) is converted to ^{239}Pu during operation, and this is taken into consideration during the design and while estimating the power output and design life expectancy.

== Reactor design ==
The design of the BES-5 FNR is such that a sub-critical assembly exists into which a rod of fissile material is inserted. Feedback and monitoring of the power level will keep the reactor delayed critical and not prompt critical, which can be done by a mechanical control system.

The fuel core of the reactor was 0.24 m (9.4 in) in diameter, 0.67 m (2 ft 2 in) long and weighed, as an assembly, 53 kg (117 lb), and contained 35–50 kg (77–110 lb) of enriched uranium. The entire reactor, including the radiation shielding, weighed 385 kg (849 lb).

The uranium fuel was more than 90% enriched ^{235}U and generated 3 kW of electrical power created by thermoelectric conversion of 100 kW of thermal output.

== Use in space ==
The BES-5 reactor was used in more than 31 satellite missions to power the radar units of the US-A surveillance satellites. The reactor was designed to be boosted to a high orbit at the end of its operational life, to prevent the radioactive fuel from re-entering Earth's atmosphere.

There were several mishaps related to failures in the ejection system, most notably Kosmos 954, which scattered radioactive debris over Canada. Kosmos 1402 also re-entered the atmosphere, but burned up over the Atlantic Ocean, away from populated areas. Kosmos 1900 failed to reach its disposal orbit and remains in low Earth orbit.

== See also ==
- Romashka reactor
- SNAP-10A
- TOPAZ nuclear reactor
- List of nuclear power systems in space
