= Sodium–potassium alloy =

Chemical compound

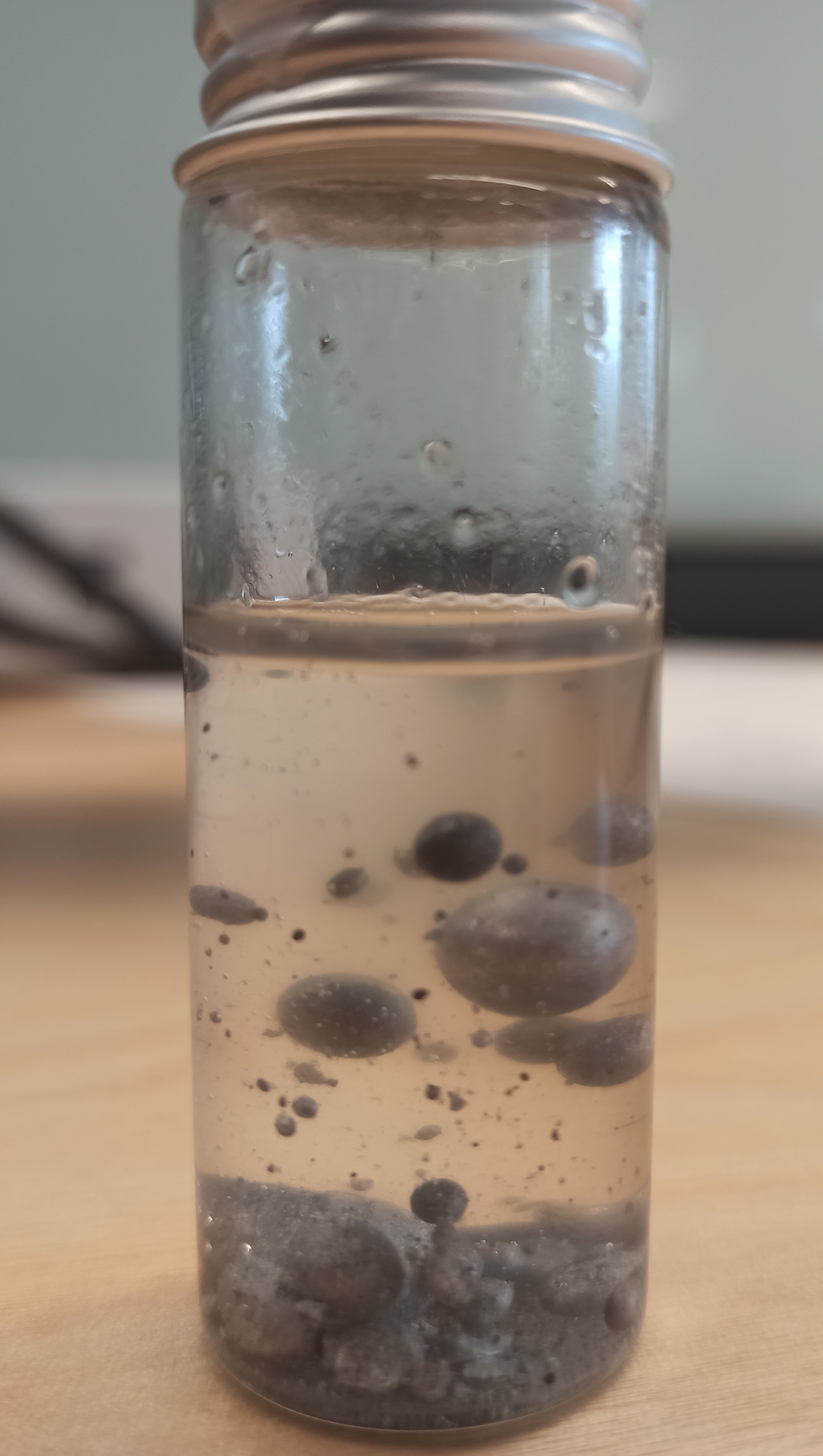
- Sodium–potassium alloy under mineral oil.
- Material type: metal alloy

Physical properties
- Density (ρ): 0.866 g/cm^{3}, 20 °C (68 °F); 0.855 g/cm^{3}, 100 °C (212 °F); 0.749 g/cm^{3}, 550 °C (1,022 °F)

Thermal properties
- Melting temperature (T_{m}): −12.6 °C (9.3 °F)
- Thermal conductivity (k) at 100 °C (212 °F): 22.4 W/(m⋅K)
- Specific heat capacity (c): 982 J/(kg⋅K)

Electrical properties
- Surface resistivity: 33.5–72.0 μΩ⋅cm

Sodium–potassium alloy, colloquially called NaK (commonly pronounced /næk/), is an alloy of two alkali metals: sodium (Na, atomic number 11) and potassium (K, atomic number 19). NaK is normally liquid at room temperature. Various commercial grades are available. Like its constituent elements, NaK is highly reactive with water and may catch fire when exposed to air, so it must be handled with special precautions.

== Properties ==
Solid–liquid phase diagram of sodium and potassium. X-axis is mass percent.

=== Physical properties ===
NaK containing 40% to 90% potassium by mass is liquid at room temperature. The eutectic mixture consists of 77% potassium and 23% sodium by mass (NaK-77), and it is a liquid from −12.6 to 785 °C (9.3 to 1,445.0 °F), and has a density of 0.866 g/cm^{3} at 21 °C (70 °F) and 0.855 g/cm^{3} at 100 °C (212 °F), making it less dense than water. It is highly reactive with water and is stored usually under hexane or other hydrocarbons, or under an inert gas (usually dry nitrogen or argon) if high purity and low levels of oxidation are required.

A solid compound, Na_{2}K, exists at low temperatures, containing 46 percent potassium by mass.

NaK has a very high surface tension, which makes large amounts of it pull into a bun-like shape. Its specific heat capacity is 982 J/(kg⋅K), which is roughly one quarter of that for water, but heat transfer is higher over a temperature gradient due to higher thermal conductivity.

=== Chemical properties ===
When stored in air, it forms a flammable potassium superoxide coating which reacts explosively with water and organics. NaK is not dense enough to sink in most hydrocarbons, but will sink in lighter mineral oil. It is unsafe to store in this manner if the superoxide has formed. A large explosion took place at the Oak Ridge Y-12 facility on December 8, 1999, when NaK was cleaned up after an accidental spill, inappropriately treated with mineral oil, and then scratched with a metal tool.

The liquid alloy also attacks PTFE ("Teflon"). Sodium–potassium alloy polymerizes dimethyldichlorosilane into polysilanes with a Si-Si backbone and methyl radicals, primarily dodecamethylcyclohexasilane:
$$\ce{6 (CH3)2SiCl2 + 12 M -> [(CH3)2Si]6 + 12 MCl} \ \ce{(M = Na, K)}$$

=== Further alloys with low melting points ===
Further alloys with low melting points are Cs_{77}K_{23} at −37.5 °C (−35.5 °F), Cs_{19}Na at −30 °C (−22 °F) and Na_{2}Rb_{23} at −5 °C (23 °F). The alloy consisting of 40.8% caesium, 11.8% sodium and 47.4% potassium has a melting point of −79.4 °C (−110.9 °F).

== Usage ==
A video of an ampoule of NaK being shaken.

=== Coolant ===
NaK has been used as the coolant in experimental fast neutron nuclear reactors. Unlike commercial plants, these are frequently shut down and defuelled. The use of lead or pure sodium, the other materials used in practical reactors, would require continual heating to maintain the coolant as a liquid. Use of NaK overcomes this. The Dounreay Fast Reactor was an example; the NaK used in the reactor was destroyed in 2012.

The United States' experimental SNAP-10A satellite, which was the first nuclear reactor in space, used NaK as coolant. The NaK was circulated through the core and thermoelectric converters by a liquid metal direct current conduction-type pump. The satellite was launched in 1965, and as of 2022 is the only fission reactor power system launched into space by the United States.

The Soviet RORSAT radar satellites were powered by a BES-5 reactor, which was cooled with NaK. In addition to the wide liquid temperature range, NaK has a very low vapor pressure, which is important in the vacuum of space.

An unintended consequence of the usage as a coolant on orbiting satellites has been the creation of additional space debris. NaK coolant has leaked from a number of satellites, including Kosmos 1818 and Kosmos 1867. The coolant self-forms into droplets of sodium–potassium of up to several centimeters in size. These objects are space debris.

The Danamics LMX Superleggera CPU cooler uses NaK to transport heat from the CPU to its cooling fins.

=== Desiccant ===
In contact with water, hydrogen is created. Because of this property, sodium–potassium alloys are used as desiccants in drying solvents prior to distillation.

=== Hydraulic fluid ===
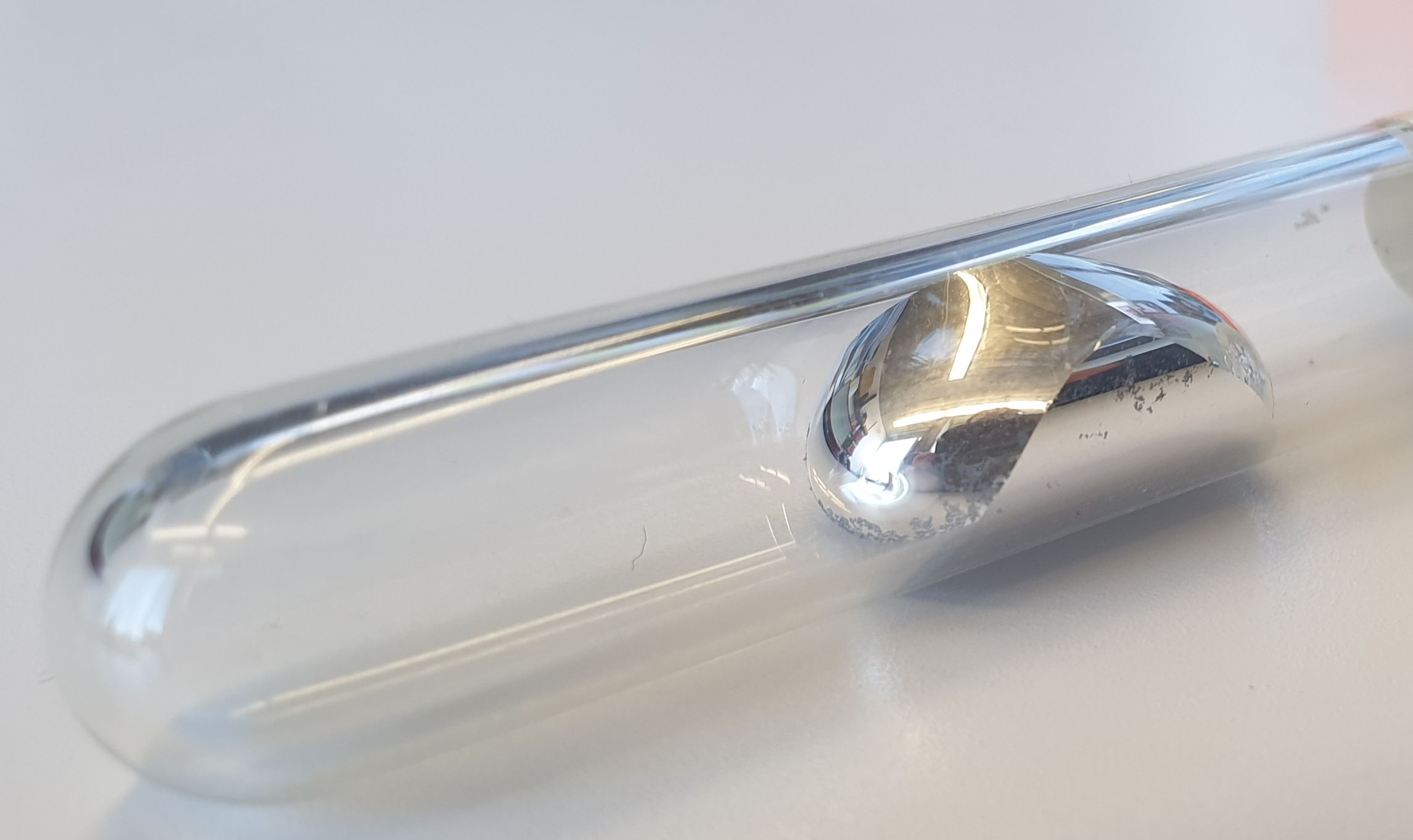
Eutectic NaK in argon atmosphere

Eutectic NaK (NaK-77, an alloy of 77% potassium and 23% sodium by mass) can be used as a hydraulic fluid in high-temperature and high-radiation environments, for temperature ranges of −12 to 760 °C (10 to 1,400 °F). Its bulk modulus at 538 °C (1,000 °F) is 2.14 GPa, higher than of a hydraulic oil at room temperature. Its lubricity is poor, so positive-displacement pumps are unsuitable and centrifugal pumps have to be used. Addition of caesium shifts the useful temperature range to −71 to 704 °C (−96 to 1,299 °F). NaK-77 was tested in hydraulic and fluidic systems for the Supersonic Low Altitude Missile. NaK may also be used to transmit forces inside high temperature pressure transducers as an alternative to mercury.

=== Chemical methods ===
NaK can be used as catalyst in some reactions, such as isobutylbenzene, a precursor to ibuprofen.

== Synthesis and production ==
Industrially, NaK is produced in a reactive distillation.

== See also ==
- Liquid metal
- Potassium compound
- Potassium sodium tartrate
- Sodium compounds
