= List of Kosmos satellites =

This is a list of Kosmos satellites.

Due to its size, the list has been split into groups of 250 satellites:

- List of Kosmos satellites (1–250)
- List of Kosmos satellites (251–500)
- List of Kosmos satellites (501–750)
- List of Kosmos satellites (751–1000)
- List of Kosmos satellites (1001–1250)
- List of Kosmos satellites (1251–1500)
- List of Kosmos satellites (1501–1750)
- List of Kosmos satellites (1751–2000)
- List of Kosmos satellites (2001–2250)
- List of Kosmos satellites (2251–2500)
- List of Kosmos satellites (2501–2750)
