= Thermionic converter =

Power generation device

A thermionic converter consists of a hot electrode which thermionically emits electrons over a potential energy barrier to a cooler electrode, producing a useful electric power output. Caesium vapor can be used to optimize the electrode work functions and provide an ion supply (by surface ionization or electron impact ionization in a plasma) to neutralize the electron space charge.

== Definition ==
From a physical electronic viewpoint, thermionic energy conversion is the direct production of electric power from heat by thermionic electron emission. From a thermodynamic viewpoint, it is the use of electron vapor as the working fluid in a power-producing cycle. A thermionic converter consists of a hot emitter electrode from which electrons are vaporized by thermionic emission and a colder collector electrode into which they are condensed after conduction through the inter-electrode plasma. The resulting current, typically several amperes per square centimeter of emitter surface, delivers electrical power to a load at a typical potential difference of 0.5–1 volt and thermal efficiency of 5–20%, depending on the emitter temperature (1500–2000 K) and mode of operation.

== History ==
After the first demonstration of the practical arc-mode caesium vapor thermionic converter by V. Wilson in 1957, several applications of it were demonstrated in the following decade, including its use with solar, combustion, radioisotope, and nuclear reactor heat sources. The application most seriously pursued, however, was the integration of thermionic nuclear fuel elements directly into the core of nuclear reactors for production of electrical power in space. The exceptionally high operating temperature of thermionic converters, which makes their practical use difficult in other applications, gives the thermionic converter decisive advantages over competing energy conversion technologies in the space power application where radiant heat rejection is required. Substantial thermionic space reactor development programs were conducted in the U.S., France, and Germany in the period 1963–1973, and the US resumed a significant thermionic nuclear fuel element development program in the period 1983–1993.

Thermionic power systems were used in combination with various nuclear reactors (BES-5, TOPAZ) as electrical power supply on a number of Soviet military surveillance satellites between 1967 and 1988. See Kosmos 954 for more details.

Although the priority for thermionic reactor use diminished as the US and Russian space programs were curtailed, research and technology development in thermionic energy conversion have continued. In recent years technology development programs for solar-heated thermionic space power systems were conducted. Prototype combustion-heated thermionic systems for domestic heat and electric power cogeneration, and for rectification, have been developed.

== Description ==
The scientific aspects of thermionic energy conversion primarily concern the fields of surface physics and plasma physics. The electrode surface properties determine the magnitude of electron emission current and electric potential at the electrode surfaces, and the plasma properties determine the transport of electron current from the emitter to the collector. All practical thermionic converters to date employ caesium vapor between the electrodes, which determines both the surface and plasma properties. Caesium is employed because it is the most easily ionized of all stable elements.

A thermionic generator is like a cyclic heat engine and its maximum efficiency is limited by Carnot's law. It is a low-Voltage high current device where current densities of 25–50 (A/squarecm) have been achieved at voltage from 1–2V. The energy of high temperature gases can be partly converted into electricity if the riser tubes of the boiler are provided cathode and anode of a thermionic generator with the interspace filled with ionized caesium vapor.

The surface property of primary interest is the work function, which is the barrier that limits electron emission current from the surface and essentially is the heat of vaporization of electrons from the surface. The work function is determined primarily by a layer of caesium atoms adsorbed on the electrode surfaces. The properties of the interelectrode plasma are determined by the mode of operation of the thermionic converter. In the ignited (or "arc") mode the plasma is maintained via ionization internally by hot plasma electrons (~ 3300 K); in the unignited mode the plasma is maintained via injection of externally produced positive ions into a cold plasma; in the hybrid mode the plasma is maintained by ions from a hot-plasma interelectrode region transferred into a cold-plasma interelectrode region.

== Recent work ==
All the applications cited above have employed technology in which the basic physical understanding and performance of the thermionic converter were essentially the same as those achieved before 1970. During the period from 1973 to 1983, however, significant research on advanced low-temperature thermionic converter technology for fossil-fueled industrial and commercial electric power production was conducted in the US, and continued until 1995 for possible space reactor and naval reactor applications. That research has shown that substantial improvements in converter performance can be obtained now at lower operating temperatures by addition of oxygen to the caesium vapor, by suppression of electron reflection at the electrode surfaces, and by hybrid mode operation. Similarly, improvements via use of oxygen-containing electrodes have been demonstrated in Russia along with design studies of systems employing the advanced thermionic converter performance. Recent studies have shown that excited Cs-atoms in thermionic converters form clusters of Cs-Rydberg matter which yield a decrease of collector emitting work function from 1.5 eV to 1.0 – 0.7 eV. Due to long-lived nature of Rydberg matter this low work function remains low for a long time which essentially increases the low-temperature converter’s efficiency.

== See also ==
- Atomic battery
- Betavoltaics
- Optoelectric nuclear battery
- Magnetohydrodynamic generator
- Radioisotope piezoelectric generator
- Radioisotope thermoelectric generator
- Thermocouple
- Thermoelectric generator
- Belousov–Zhabotinsky reaction
