= TOPAZ nuclear reactor =

Soviet nuclear reactor for use in space

The TOPAZ nuclear reactor is a lightweight nuclear reactor developed for long term space use by the Soviet Union. Cooled by liquid metal, it uses a high-temperature moderator containing hydrogen and highly enriched fuel and produces electricity using a thermionic converter.

== Nomenclature ==
In initial discussions, it was unclear that TOPAZ and the somewhat similar YENISEI reactors were different systems, and when the existence of the two Russian thermionic reactors became generally known, US personnel began referring to TOPAZ as TOPAZ-I and YENISEI as TOPAZ-II.

== TOPAZ-I ==
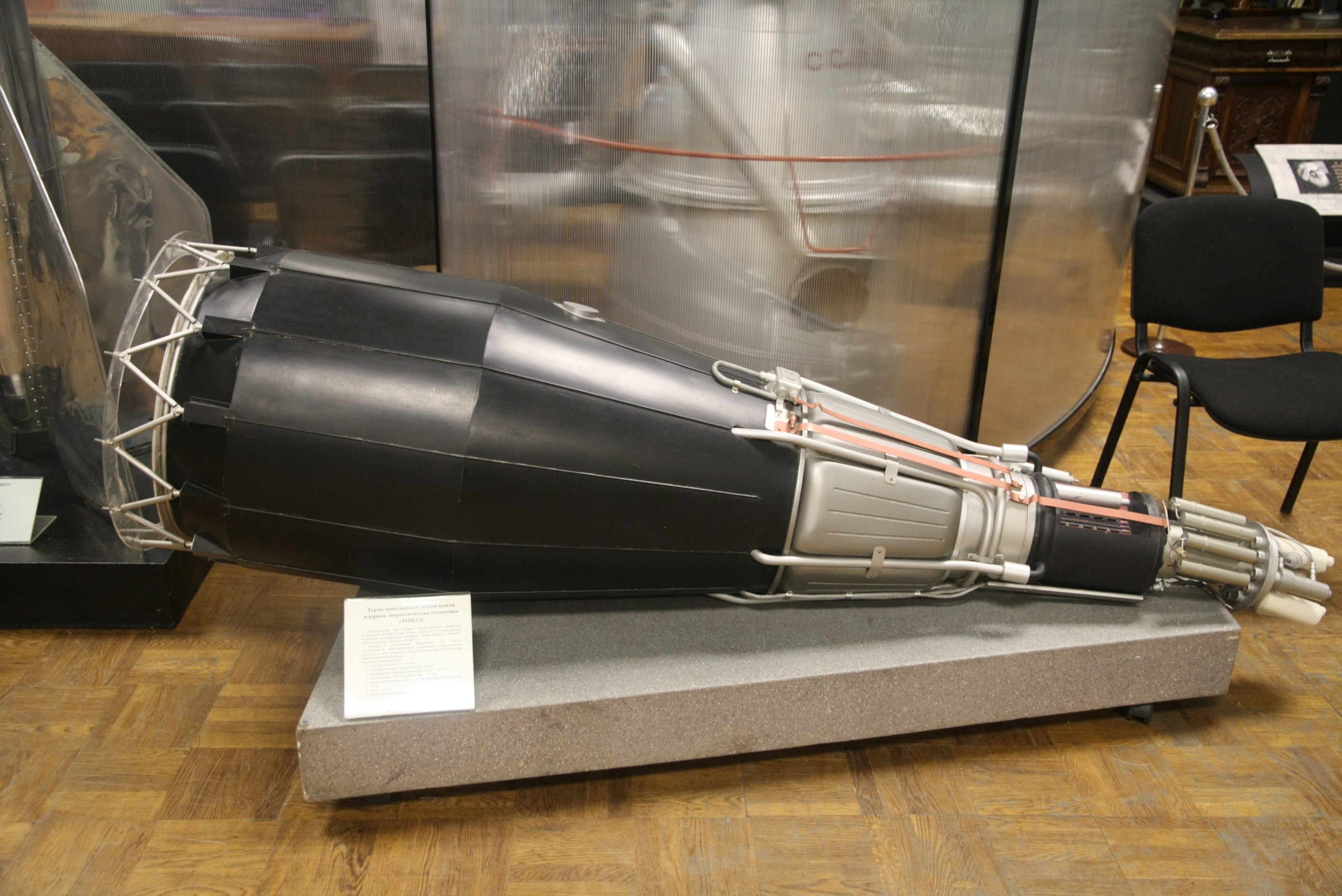
Scaled-down model of Topaz reactor

The first thermionic converter reactors were discussed by scientists at the Los Alamos Scientific Laboratory (LASL) in 1957. Following the visit of Soviet scientists to LASL in 1958, they carried out tests on TI systems in 1961, initially developing the single cell YENISEI reactor (also known as TOPAZ-II). Work was carried out by the Kurchatov Institute of Atomic Energy and the Central Bureau for Machine Building to develop the multi-cell TOPAZ (also known as TOPAZ-I), a Russian acronym for "Thermionic Experiment with Conversion in Active Zone". It was first ground tested in 1971, when its existence was acknowledged. It was under the auspices of Krasnaya Zvezda.

The first TOPAZ reactor operated for 1,300 hours (~54 days) and then was shut down for detailed examination. It was capable of delivering 5 kW of power for 3–5 years from 12 kg (26 lb) of fuel. Reactor mass was ~ 320 kg (710 lb).

TOPAZ was first flown in 1987 on the experimental Plazma-A satellites Kosmos 1818 and Kosmos 1867, which were intended to test both the TOPAZ reactor and the Plasma-2 SPT electric engine. Both reactors were damaged in the 1990s, causing a leak of radioactive coolant.

A proposed follow-up Plasma-2 was to have been equipped with an improved reactor. One reactor operated for 6 months, the other for a year. The program was canceled by Mikhail Gorbachev in 1988.

== TOPAZ-II ==
TOPAZ-II TFE -scheme of the thermionic converter. The UO_{2} nucleus is heated of 808K to 1923K. The heated shell of the Mo/W core emits electrons. The Mo/Nb electron collector absorbs electrons. Both are insulated from each other by a high-temperature-resistant insulating pad Sc_{2}O_{3}, which is anchored in the Nb ring. The gap is filled with Cs vapors. The collector is separated from casing by an Al_{2}O_{3} insulating pad. This gap is filled with Helium gas. The stainless steel double shell is sodium cooled.

In the TOPAZ-II or YENISEI reactor each fuel pin (96% enriched UO_{2}) is sheathed in an emitter which is in turn surrounded by a collector, and these form the 37 fuel elements which penetrate the cylindrical zirconium hydride (ZrH) moderator. This in turn is surrounded by a beryllium neutron reflector with 12 rotating control drums. Liquid metal coolant (NaK) surrounds each fuel element. The mass of the reactor is ~ 1,061 kg (2,339 lb).

In January 1991 a model of the TOPAZ-II was exhibited at a scientific symposium in Albuquerque, generating interest in the US in the possible purchase of it and the Strategic Defense Initiative Organization arranged to buy two TOPAZ-II reactors from Russia for a total of $13 million, planning to use the reactors to improve US models. However, the Nuclear Regulatory Commission ruled that US law prohibited the "export" of such a device to the Soviet Union - even though it was Soviet-made and only a model rather than an actual reactor. It took a month before the situation was resolved by a new NRC ruling and the model returned to Russia.

The United States Department of State then put a hold on the deal, which was only lifted when Secretary of State James Baker intervened. One of the reactors was to be used in a flight test in 1995 to power experimental electrical thrusters, but there were objections from scientists concerned about the possible impact of radiation emitted by the reactor on instruments aboard space satellites and protests from opponents of space-based weapons and nuclear power. In addition, the Department of Energy was slow to grant the necessary approval and in 1993 budget restrictions forced the cancellation of the program.

Six TOPAZ-II reactors and their associated support equipment were flown to the US, where they were extensively ground tested by US, British, French, and Russian engineers. The reactors' unique design allowed them to be tested without being fuelled. Although the test program was considered a success, no plans were pursued to fly any of the reactors.

== Manufacturer ==
The TOPAZ reactor is manufactured by the State Research Institute, Scientific Industrial Association (also known as Luch), which is operated by Russia's Ministry of Atomic Energy.
