= Nuclear power in space =

Space exploration using nuclear energy

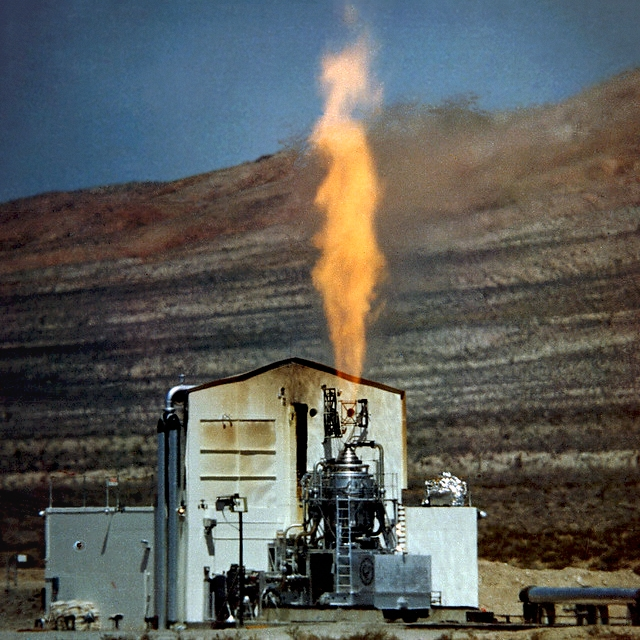
The Kiwi-A Prime nuclear thermal rocket engine 1960 test at Jackass Flats, Nevada.

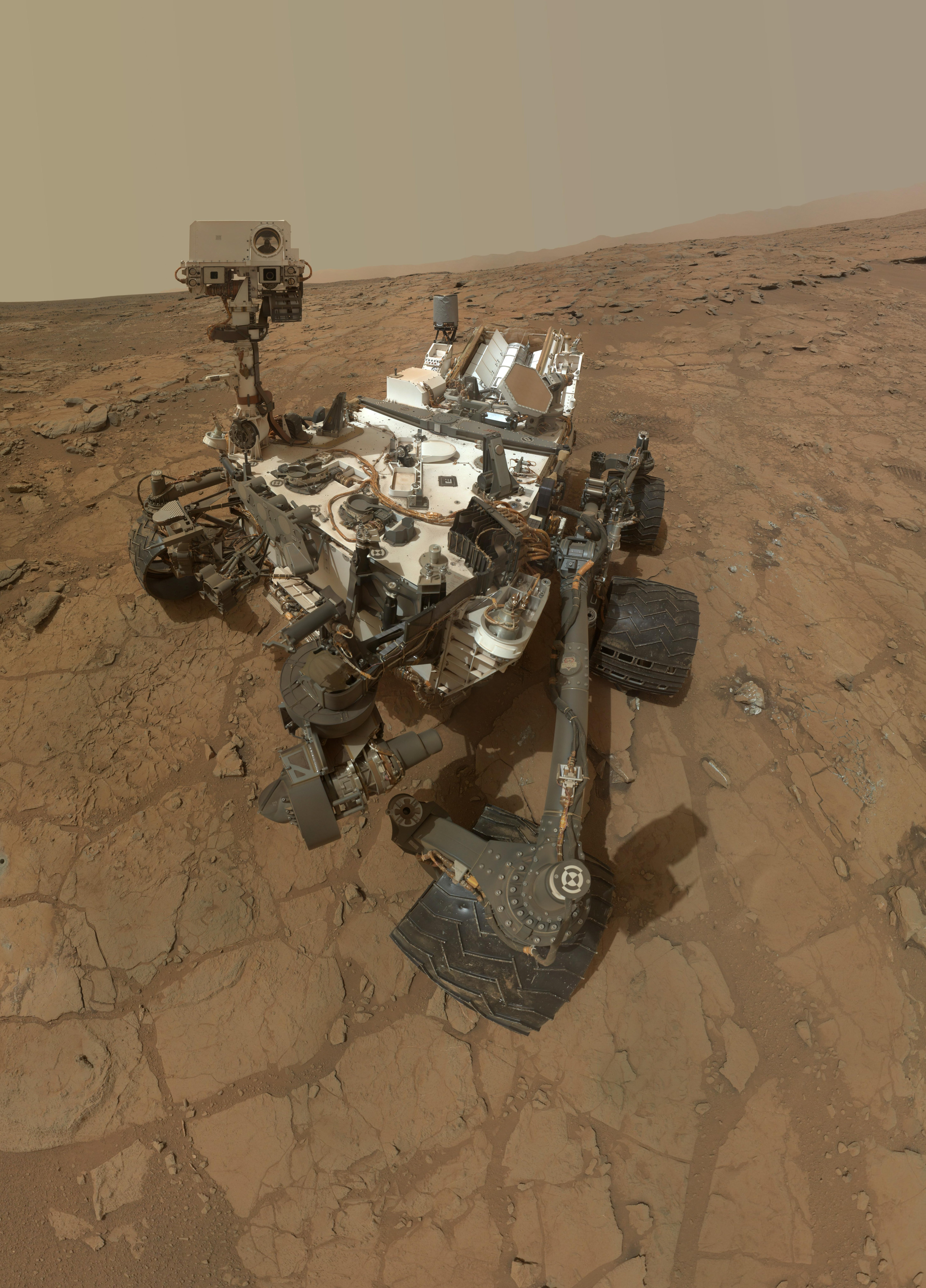
Mars Curiosity rover powered by a RTG on Mars. White RTG with fins is visible at the far side of the rover.

Nuclear power in space is the use of nuclear power onboard spacecraft, for electricity, heat, or propulsion. The most common type is a radioisotope thermoelectric generator (RTG), which has been used on satellites, space probes and on the crewed Apollo missions to the Moon. Small nuclear fission reactors for Earth satellites have also been flown, by the Soviet US-A program and American SNAP-10A. Radioisotope heater units (RHU) are also used to prevent components from becoming too cold to function.

Among nuclear power systems launched into space, plutonium-238 is the most common radioisotope fuel. Its half-life of 87.7 years allows RTGs to power spacecraft consistently for decades at electric outputs of hundreds of watts. Nuclear power systems function independently of sunlight, which is advantageous for Mars and outer Solar System exploration. RTGs used on Mars missions include the Curiosity and Perseverance rovers and Viking landers. All spacecraft leaving the Solar System, i.e., Pioneer 10 and 11, Voyager 1 and 2, and New Horizons use NASA RTGs, as did the outer planet missions of Galileo, Cassini, and Ulysses. However, due to costs, the global shortage of plutonium-238, and advances in solar-cell efficiency, more recent Jupiter missions have opted for solar arrays. NASA also developed the Advanced Stirling radioisotope generator.

Spacecraft nuclear fission reactors saw limited experimental use during the Cold War. They can achieve kilowatt electric outputs, approximately an order of magnitude more than RTGs, but this comes with more complex engineering, cost, and hazards. The United States tested the first and its only space reactor aboard SNAP-10A for 43 days in 1965. The Soviet Union's US-A program tested the BES-5 and TOPAZ-I reactors in space, as well as developing Romashka and TOPAZ-II reactors. At five kilowatts of electric power, TOPAZ-I was the most powerful known nuclear system in space. Both countries' satellites also used electrically-powered ion thrusters, making them the only experimental uses of nuclear electric propulsion. The Soviet program caused issues with contamination from Kosmos 954's disintegration over Canada, persistent space debris from its sodium-potassium coolant, and radiation interfering with gamma ray telescopes. NASA also developed the Kilopower reactor.

Aside from nuclear electric propulsion, more powerful nuclear space propulsion systems have been developed and undergone ground testing. Nuclear thermal rockets typically used large reactors with liquid hydrogen as both coolant and propellant, and achieved specific impulses twice those of chemical rocket engines. The United States carried out ground test-firings in the 1960s under Project Rover and NERVA, while the Soviet Union's RD-0410 was ground-tested in 1985. Speculative systems include nuclear pulse propulsion, pulsed nuclear thermal rockets, and nuclear fusion propulsion, and were explored by Project Orion, Project Daedalus, and Project Longshot.

== Hazards and regulations ==
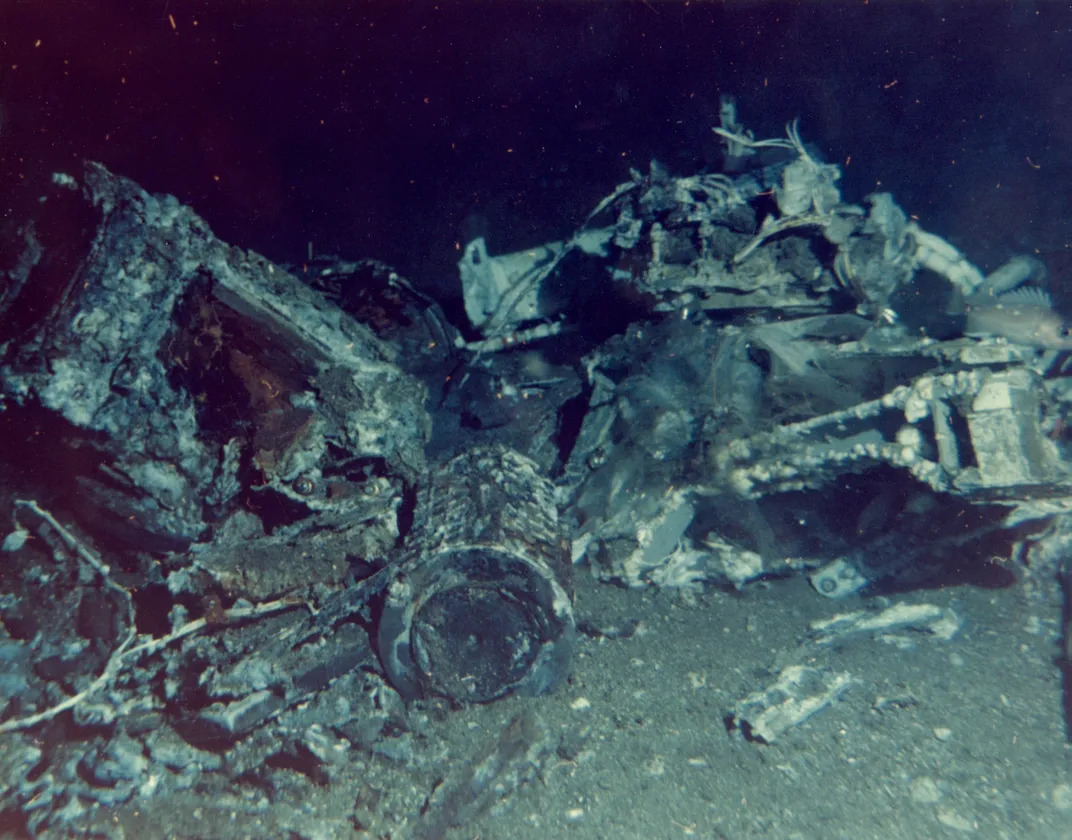
Intact SNAP-19 fuel capsule is shown among debris on Pacific Ocean floor, resulting from the aborted launch of a Nimbus B.

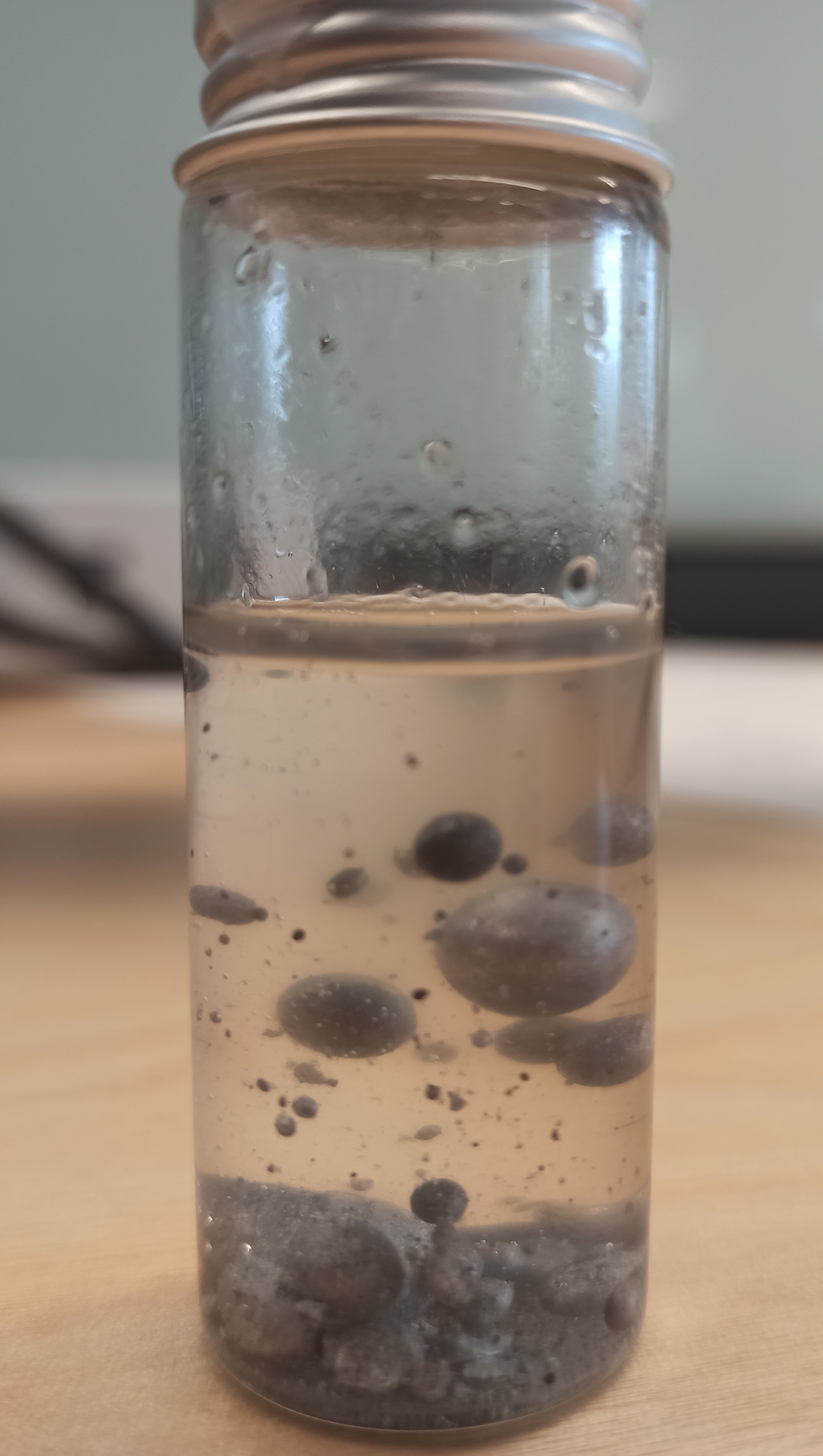
Sodium-potassium (NaK) alloy droplets similar to those released in high Earth orbit by the Soviet RORSAT program's fission reactors.

=== Hazards ===
After the ban of nuclear weapons in space by the Outer Space Treaty in 1967, nuclear power has been discussed at least since 1972 as a sensitive issue by states. Space nuclear power sources may experience accidents during launch, operation, and end-of-service phases, resulting in the exposure of nuclear power sources to extreme physical conditions and the release of radioactive materials into the Earth's atmosphere and surface environment. For example, all Radioisotope Power Systems (RPS) used in space missions have utilized Pu-238. Plutonium-238 is a radioactive element that emits alpha particles. Although NASA states that it exists in spacecraft in a form that is not readily absorbed and poses little to no chemical or toxicological risk upon entering the human body (e.g., in the design of American spacecraft, plutonium dioxide exists in ceramic form to prevent inhalation or ingestion by humans, and it is placed within strict safety protection systems), it cannot be denied that it may be released and dispersed into the environment, posing hazards to both the environment and human health. Pu-238 primarily accumulates in the lungs, liver, and bones through inhalation of powdered form, thereby posing risks to human health.

==== Accidents within the atmosphere ====
There have been several environmental accidents related to space nuclear power in history.

In 1964, a Thor-Ablestar rocket carrying the Transit 5BN-3 satellite failed to reach orbit, destroying the satellite in re-entry over the southern hemisphere. Its one kilogram of plutonium-238 fuel within the SNAP-9A Radioisotope Thermoelectric Generator (RTG) was released into the stratosphere. A 1972 Department of Energy soil sample report attributed 13.4 kilocuries of Pu-238 to the accident, from the one kilogram's 17 kilocuries total. This was contrasted to the 11,600 kilocuries of strontium-90 deposited by all nuclear weapons testing.

In May 1968, a Thor-Agena rocket carrying the Nimbus B satellite was destroyed by a guidance error. Its plutonium SNAP-19 RTG was recovered intact, without leakage from the Pacific sea floor, refurbished, and flown on Nimbus 3.

In April 1970, the Apollo 13 lunar mission was aborted due to an oxygen tank explosion in the spacecraft's service module. Upon reentering the atmosphere, the lunar module equipped with the SNAP-27 RTG exploded and crashed into the South Pacific Ocean, with no leakage of nuclear fuel. This is the only intact flown nuclear system that remains on Earth without recovery.

In early 1978, the Soviet spacecraft Kosmos 954, powered by a 45-kilogram highly enriched uranium reactor, went into an uncontrolled descent. Due to the unpredictable impact point, preparations were made for potential contamination of inhabited areas. This event underscored the potential danger of space objects containing radioactive materials, emphasizing the need for strict international emergency planning and information sharing in the event of space nuclear accidents. It also led to the intergovernmental formulation of emergency protocols, such as Operation Morning Light, where Canada and the United States jointly recovered 80 radioactive fragments within a 600-kilometer range in the Canadian Northwest Territories. COSMOS 954 became the first example for global emergency preparedness and response arrangements for satellites carrying nuclear power sources.

==== NaK droplet debris ====
The majority of nuclear power systems launched into space remain in graveyard orbits around Earth. Between 1980 and 1989, the BES-5 and TOPAZ-I fission reactors of the Soviet RORSAT program suffered leakages of their liquid sodium–potassium alloy coolant. Each reactor lost on average 5.3 kilograms of its 13 kilogram total coolant, totaling 85 kilograms across 16 reactors. A 2017 ESA paper calculated that, while smaller droplets quickly decay, 65 kilograms of coolant still remain in centimeter-sized droplets around 800 km altitude orbits, comprising 10% of the space debris in that size range.

==== Trapped-positron problem ====
The structure of Earth's magnetosphere. Fission-produced trapped positrons precess along the innermost red field lines and can interfere with instruments on satellites.

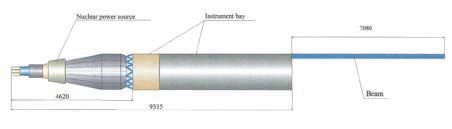
Diagram of Kosmos 1818 and Kosmos 1867, which carried the TOPAZ-I fission reactors

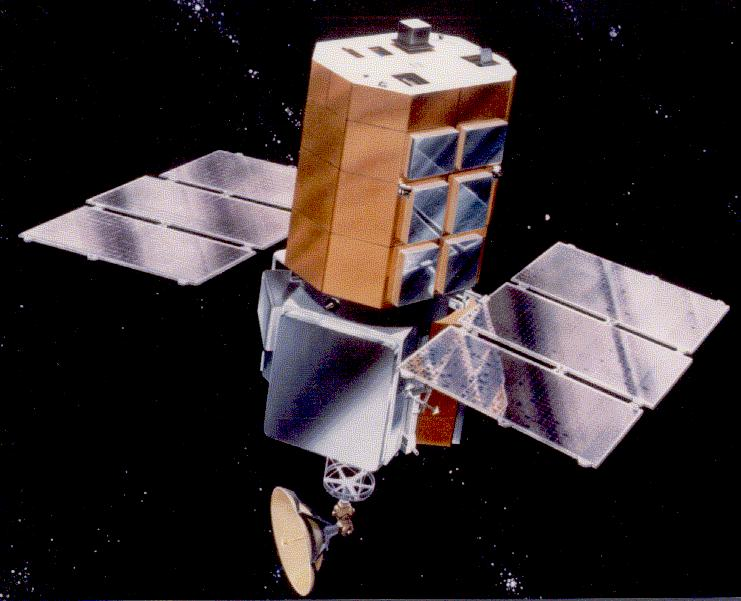
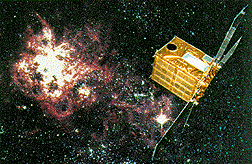
The Solar Maximum Mission and Ginga satellites, both carrying gamma ray telescopes affected by reactor positron pollution

Orbital fission reactors are a source of significant interference for orbital gamma ray observatories. Unlike RTGs which largely rely on energy from alpha decay, fission reactors produce significant gamma radiation, with the uranium-235 chain releasing 6.3% of its total energy as prompt (shown below) and delayed (daughter product decay) gamma rays:

$\begin{array}{r} ^1_0\text{n}\ +\ ^{235}_{92}\text{U}\longrightarrow\ ^{141}_{56}\text{Ba}\ +\ ^{92}_{36}\text{Kr}\ +\ 3\ ^{1}_{0}\text{n}\ + \gamma \end{array}$

Pair production occurs as these gamma rays interact with reactor or adjacent material, ejecting electrons and positrons into space:

$\gamma + \text{Z} \longrightarrow\ e^+ + e^- + \text{Z}\$

These electrons and positrons then become trapped in the magnetosphere's flux tubes, which carry them through a range of orbital altitudes, where the positrons can annihilate with the structure of other satellites, again producing gamma rays:

$e^+ + e^- \longrightarrow \gamma\ + \gamma$

These gamma rays can interfere with satellite instruments. This most notably occurred in 1987, when the TOPAZ-I nuclear reactors (6–10 kWe) aboard the twin RORSAT test vehicles Kosmos 1818 and Kosmos 1867 affected the gamma ray telescopes aboard NASA's Solar Maximum Mission and the University of Tokyo/ISAS' Ginga. TOPAZ-I remains the most powerful fission reactor operated in space, with previous Soviet missions using the BES-5 reactor (2–3 kWe) at altitudes well below gamma ray observatories.

=== Regulations ===
==== National regulations ====
The presence of space nuclear sources and the potential consequences of nuclear accidents on humans and the environment cannot be ignored. Therefore, there have been strict regulations for the application of nuclear power in outer space to mitigate the risks associated with the use of space nuclear power sources among governments.

For instance, in the United States, safety considerations are integrated into every stage of the design, testing, manufacturing, and operation of space nuclear systems. The NRC oversee the ownership, use, and production of nuclear materials and facilities. The Department of Energy is bound by the National Environmental Policy Act (NEPA) to consider the environmental impact of nuclear material handling, transportation, and storage. NASA, the Department of Energy, and other federal and local authorities develop comprehensive emergency plans for each launch, including timely public communication. In the event of an accident, monitoring teams equipped with highly specialized support equipment and automated stations are deployed around the launch site to identify potential radioactive material releases, quantify and describe the release scope, predict the quantity and distribution of dispersed material, and develop and recommend protective actions.

==== International regulations ====
At the global level, following the 1978 COSMOS 954 incident, the international community recognized the need to establish a set of principles and guidelines to ensure the safe use of nuclear power sources in outer space. Consequently, in 1992, the General Assembly adopted resolution 47/68, titled "Principles Relevant to the Use of Nuclear Power Sources in Outer Space." These principles primarily address safety assessment, international information exchange and dialogue, responsibility, and compensation. It stipulates that the principles should be revisited by the Committee on the Peaceful Uses of Outer Space no later than two years after adoption. After years of consultation and deliberation, in 2009, the International Safety Framework for Nuclear Power Source Applications in Outer Space was adopted to enhance safety for space missions involving nuclear power sources. It offers guidance for engineers and mission designers, although its effective implementation necessitates integration into existing processes.

The "Safety Framework" asserts that each nation bears responsibility for the safety of its space nuclear power. Governments and international organizations must justify the necessity of space nuclear power applications compared to potential alternatives and demonstrate their usage based on comprehensive safety assessments, including probabilistic risk analysis, with particular attention to the risk of public exposure to harmful radiation or radioactive materials. Nations also need to establish and maintain robust safety oversight bodies, systems, and emergency preparedness to minimize the likelihood and mitigate the consequences of potential accidents. Unlike the 1992 "Principles," the "Safety Framework" applies to all types of space nuclear power source development and applications, not just the technologies existing at the time.

In the draft report on the implementation of the Safety Framework for Nuclear Power Source Applications in Outer Space published in 2023, the working group considers that the safety framework has been widely accepted and demonstrated to be helpful for member states in developing and/or implementing national systems and policies to ensure the safe use of nuclear power sources in outer space. Other member states and intergovernmental organizations not currently involved in the utilization of space nuclear power sources also acknowledge and accept the value of this framework, taking into account safety issues associated with such applications.

== Benefits ==
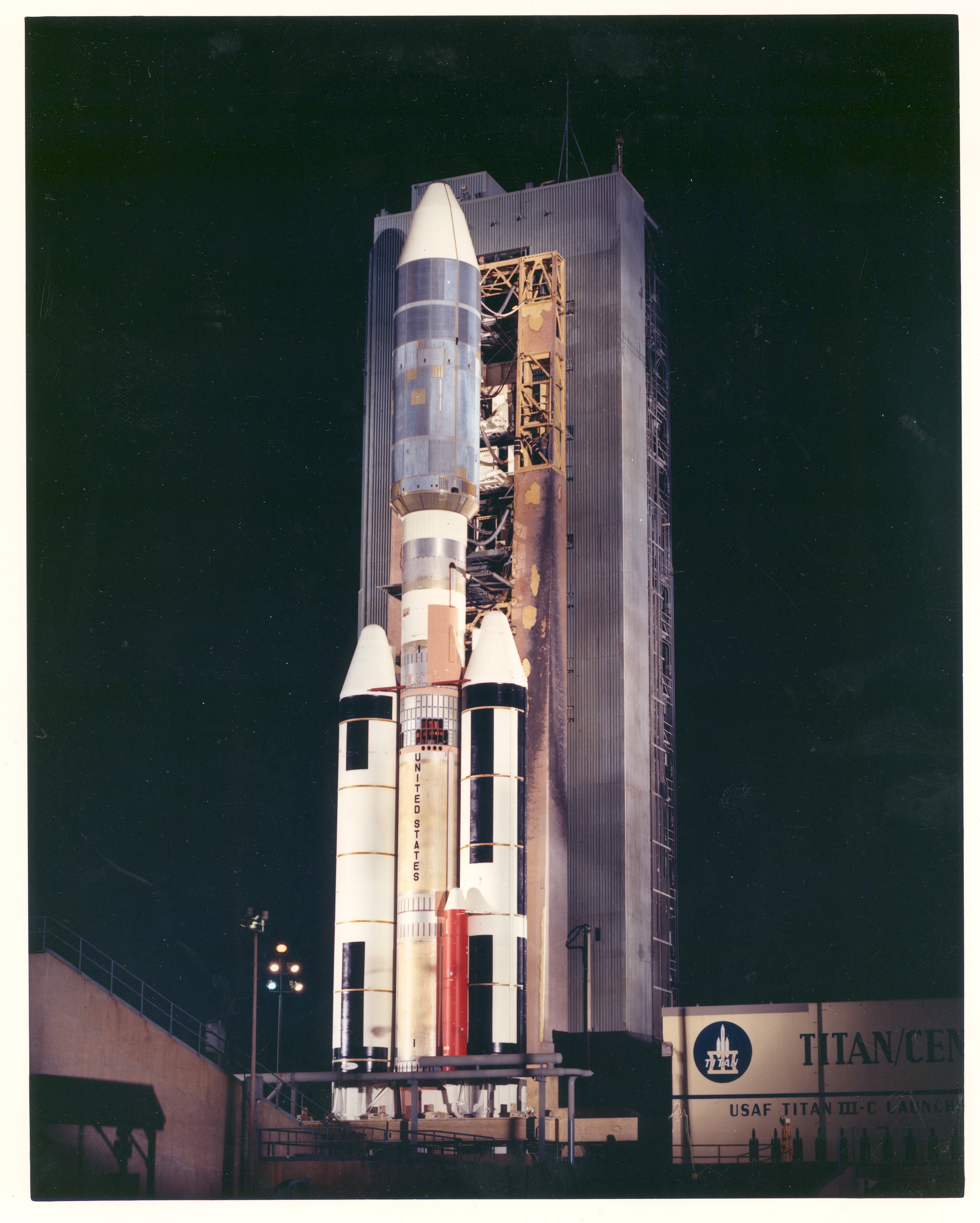
Both the Viking 1 and Viking 2 landers used RTGs for power on the surface of Mars. (Viking launch vehicle pictured)

=== Power and heat ===
Nuclear power systems function independently of sunlight, which is highly advantageous for outer Solar System exploration, i.e., Jupiter and beyond. All spacecraft leaving the Solar System, i.e., Pioneer 10 and 11, Voyager 1 and 2, and New Horizons use NASA RTGs, as did the outer planet missions of Galileo, Cassini, and Ulysses. However, in part, due to the global shortage of plutonium-238, and advances in solar efficiency, the more recent Jupiter missions of Juno, Jupiter Icy Moons Explorer, and Europa Clipper, as well as the Jupiter trojan asteroid mission of Lucy, all opted for large solar arrays despite a relative 4% solar flux at Jupiter's orbit of 5.2 AU.

Solar power is much more commonly used for its low cost and efficiency, primarily in Earth and lunar orbit and for interplanetary missions within the inner Solar System, i.e., missions to Mercury, Venus, Mars and the asteroid belt. However, nuclear power has been used for some of these missions such as the Apollo program's SNAP-27 RTG for lunar surface use, and the MMRTG on the Mars Curiosity and Perseverance rovers.

Nuclear-based systems can have less mass than solar cells of equivalent power, allowing more compact spacecraft that are easier to orient and direct in space. This makes them useful for radar satellites such as the RORSAT program deployed by the Soviet Union. In the case of crewed spaceflight, nuclear power concepts that can power both life support and propulsion systems may reduce both cost and flight time. Apollo 12 marked the first use of a nuclear power system on a crewed flight, carrying a SNAP-27 RTG to power the Apollo Lunar Surface Experiments Package.

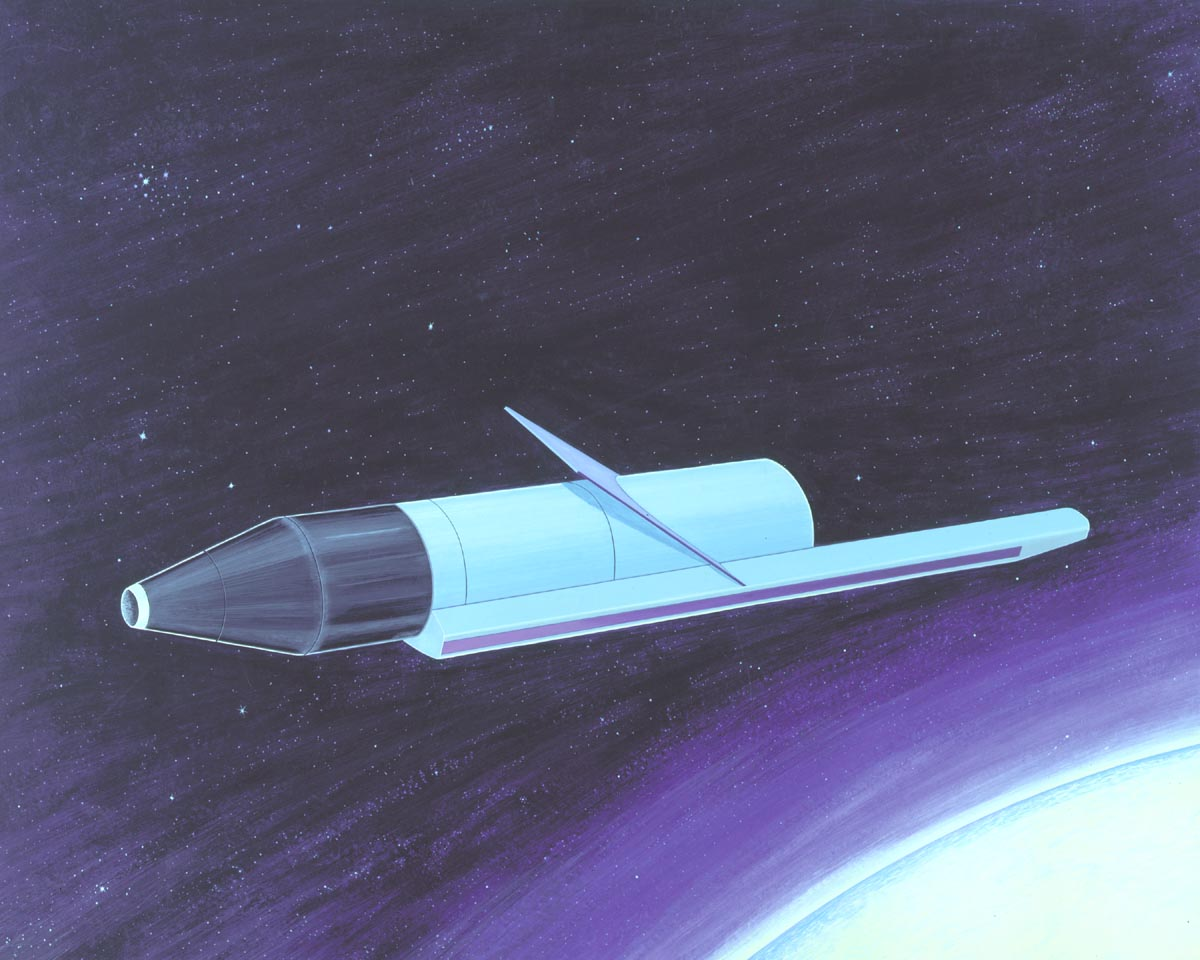
Artist's depiction of a RORSAT radar reconnaissance satellite, typically powered by a BES-5 fission reactor.

=== Powering radar systems ===
As active electromagnetic detectors including radar observe a power-distance drop-off of $P \propto R^{-4}$, comparatively low Earth orbits are desirable.

The Soviet Union did not launch interplanetary missions beyond Mars, and generally developed few RTGs. American RTGs in the 1970s supplied power in the 100 W range. For the RORSAT military radar satellites (1967–1988), fission reactors, especially the BES-5, were developed to supply an average of 2 kW to the radar. At altitudes averaging 255.3 km, they would have rapidly decayed if they had used a large solar array instead.

The later United States Lacrosse/Onyx radar satellite program, beginning launches in 1988, operated at altitudes of 420–718 km. To power radar at this range, a solar array reportedly 45 m in length was operated, speculated to supply 10–20 kW.

=== Propulsion ===
The following technologies have been proposed and in some cases ground or space-tested for propulsion via nuclear energy.

Propulsion	Nuclear process	Cycle (Note: Open cycles allow the nuclear fuel into the exhaust, closed cycles do not.)	Core power analogue	Tested designs	Proposed designs
Nuclear electric rocket	Fission	Closed	Space fission reactors, usually liquid metal cooled	(United States) SNAP-10A, (Soviet Union) Kosmos 1818	(United States) Project Prometheus, (Russia) TEM
Nuclear thermal rocket	Fission	Either	High/Very high temperature gas-cooled reactor	(United States) Project Rover, (United States) NERVA, (Soviet Union) RD-0410	(United States) Project Timberwind, (United States) Lockheed Martin DRACO
Pulsed nuclear thermal rocket	Fission	Either	TRIGA reactor		
Nuclear salt-water rocket	Fission	Open	Aqueous homogeneous reactor		
Gas core reactor rocket	Fission	Open	Gaseous fission reactor		
Nuclear lightbulb	Fission	Closed	Gaseous fission reactor		
Fission-fragment rocket	Fission	Open	Fission fragment reactor		Rotating fuel, dusty plasma, americium, aerogel core
Fission sail	Fission	Open			
Radioisotope rocket	Decay	Open	Radioisotope thermoelectric generator		
Nuclear fission pulse propulsion	Fission	Open	Fission bomb		(United States) Project Orion
Nuclear fusion pulse propulsion	Fusion	Open	Inertial confinement fusion		Project Daedalus, Project Longshot
Magnetic fusion rocket	Fusion	Open	Magnetic confinement fusion		Direct Fusion Drive

== Types ==
=== Radioisotope systems ===
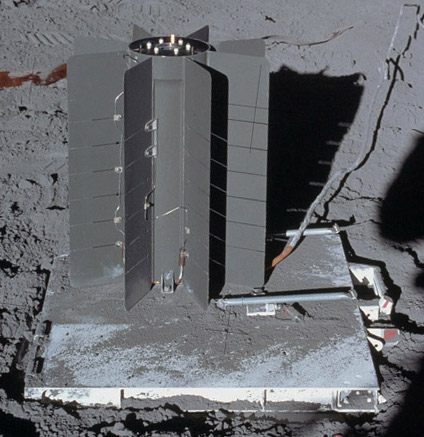
SNAP-27 on the Moon

For more than fifty years, radioisotope thermoelectric generators (RTGs) have been the United States' main nuclear power source in space. RTGs offer many benefits; they are relatively safe and maintenance-free, are resilient under harsh conditions, and can operate for decades. RTGs are particularly desirable for use in parts of space where solar power is not a viable power source. Dozens of RTGs have been implemented to power 25 different US spacecraft, some of which have been operating for more than 20 years. Over 40 radioisotope thermoelectric generators have been used globally (principally US and USSR) on space missions.

The advanced Stirling radioisotope generator (ASRG, a model of Stirling radioisotope generator (SRG)) produces roughly four times the electric power of an RTG per unit of nuclear fuel, but flight-ready units based on Stirling technology are not expected until 2028. NASA plans to utilize two ASRGs to explore Titan in the distant future.

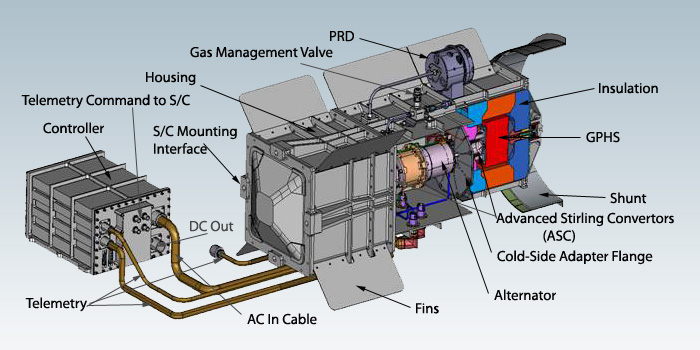
Cutaway diagram of the advanced Stirling radioisotope generator.

Radioisotope power generators include:

- SNAP-19, SNAP-27 (Systems for Nuclear Auxiliary Power)
- MHW-RTG
- GPHS-RTG
- MMRTG
- ASRG (Advanced Stirling radioisotope generator)

Radioisotope heater units (RHUs) are also used on spacecraft to warm scientific instruments to the proper temperature so they operate efficiently. A larger model of RHU called the General Purpose Heat Source (GPHS) is used to power RTGs and the ASRG.

Extremely slow-decaying radioisotopes have been proposed for use on interstellar probes with multi-decade lifetimes.

As of 2011, another direction for development was an RTG assisted by subcritical nuclear reactions.

=== Fission systems ===
Fission power systems may be utilized to power a spacecraft's heating or propulsion systems. In terms of heating requirements, when spacecraft require more than 100 kW for power, fission systems are much more cost effective than RTGs.

In 1965, the US launched a space reactor, the SNAP-10A, which had been developed by Atomics International, then a division of North American Aviation.

Over the past few decades, several fission reactors have been proposed, and the Soviet Union launched 31 BES-5 low power fission reactors in their RORSAT satellites utilizing thermoelectric converters between 1967 and 1988.

In the 1960s and 1970s, the Soviet Union developed TOPAZ reactors, which utilize thermionic converters instead, although the first test flight was not until 1987.

In 1983, NASA and other US government agencies began development of a next-generation space reactor, the SP-100, contracting with General Electric and others. In 1994, the SP-100 program was cancelled, largely for political reasons, with the idea of transitioning to the Russian TOPAZ-II reactor system. Although some TOPAZ-II prototypes were ground-tested, the system was never deployed for US space missions.

In 2008, NASA announced plans to utilize a small fission power system on the surface of the Moon and Mars, and began testing "key" technologies for it to come to fruition.

Proposed fission power system spacecraft and exploration systems have included SP-100, JIMO nuclear electric propulsion, and Fission Surface Power.

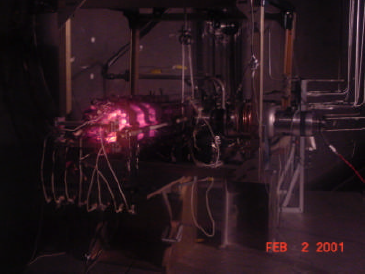
SAFE-30 small experimental reactor

A number of micro nuclear reactor types have been developed or are in development for space applications:

- RAPID-L
- closed cycle magnetohydrodynamic (CCMHD) power generation system
- SP-100
- Alkali Metal Thermoelectric Converter (AMTEC)
- Kilopower

Nuclear thermal propulsion systems (NTR) are based on the heating power of a fission reactor, offering a more efficient propulsion system than one powered by chemical reactions. Current research focuses more on nuclear electric systems as the power source for providing thrust to propel spacecraft that are already in space.

Other space fission reactors for powering space vehicles include the SAFE-400 reactor and the HOMER-15. In 2020, Roscosmos (the Russian Federal Space Agency) plans to launch a spacecraft utilizing nuclear-powered propulsion systems (developed at the Keldysh Research Center), which includes a small gas-cooled fission reactor with 1 MWe.

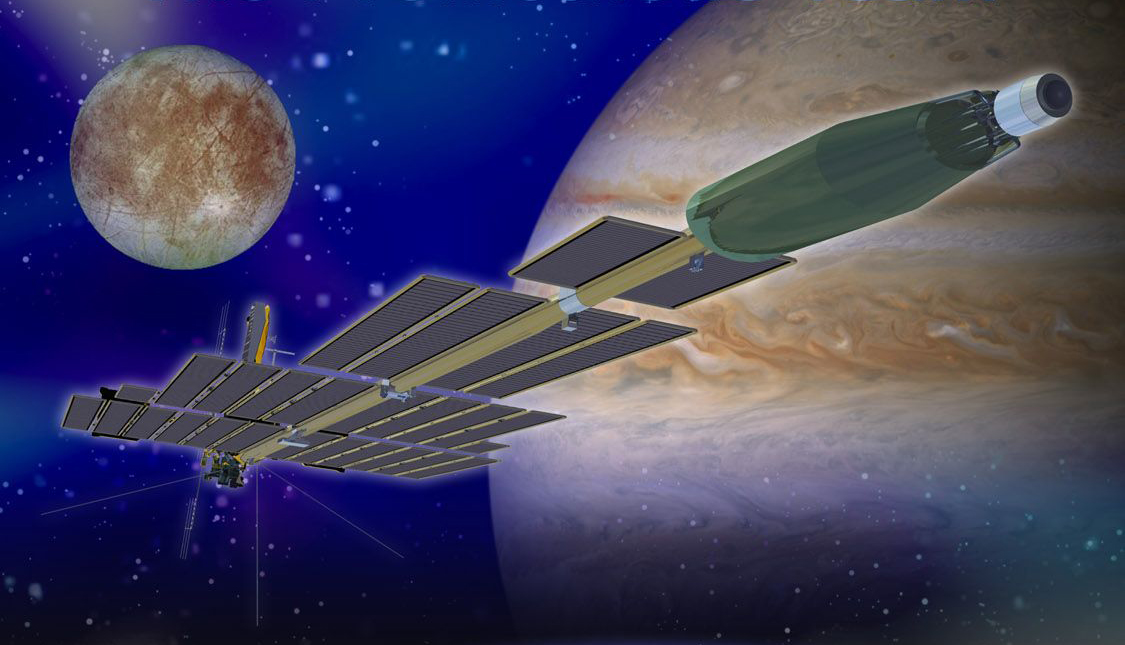
Artists's Conception of Jupiter Icy Moons Orbiter mission for Prometheus, with the reactor on the right, providing power to ion engines and electronics.

=== Project Prometheus ===
In 2002, NASA announced an initiative towards developing nuclear systems, which later came to be known as Project Prometheus. A major part of the Prometheus Project was to develop the Stirling Radioisotope Generator and the Multi-Mission Thermoelectric Generator, both types of RTGs. The project also aimed to produce a safe and long-lasting space fission reactor system for a spacecraft's power and propulsion, replacing the long-used RTGs. Budget constraints resulted in the effective halting of the project, but Project Prometheus has had success in testing new systems. After its creation, scientists successfully tested a High Power Electric Propulsion (HiPEP) ion engine, which offered substantial advantages in fuel efficiency, thruster lifetime, and thruster efficiency over other power sources.

Project Prometheus was phased out in 2006.

=== Fission Surface Power Systems ===
In 2006, NASA introduced the Fission Surface Power (FSP) project. The goal of such a project was to enable the development of a nuclear fission-based power system for use on the surface of the moon. NASA released conceptual studies of such a system throughout the 2010s.

In September 2020, NASA and the Department of Energy (DOE) issued a formal request for proposals for a lunar nuclear power system, otherwise known as a Fission Surface Power project. The project is being managed by NASA's Glenn Research Center in Cleveland, Ohio, and is funded through Space Technology Mission Directorate’s Technology Demonstration Missions program. NASA is collaborating with the DOE Idaho National Laboratory to progress this mission forward. The desire for developing these systems is to assist the Artemis Project in occupying the moon and provide a reliable energy source in areas that have weeks-long lunar night cycles. Furthermore, these systems can be extended to future Mars missions, which further increase design consideration complexity due to atmospheric events, such as dust storms.

Phase 1 of the project is focused on the development of different preliminary low enriched uranium material designs to determine the feasibility of the different concepts. The system is expected to have a 40 kW (54 hp) output at 120 Vdc lasting 10 years, weigh less than 6,000 kg (13,000 lb) while fitting on a lander module, and produce less than 5 rem per year at a minimum distance of 1 km (0.62 mi). Three $5 million dollar contracts were awarded in 2022 to Lockheed Martin, Westinghouse Electric Corporation, and IX (joint venture of Intuitive Machines and X-energy) to engage in industry developed reactor designs for power conversion, heat rejection, power management, and distribution systems.

As it currently stands, the initial base location will be located on the southern pole of the moon so there is an almost constant stream of sun light for solar cells to power habitation modules, estimating power limits to be reached at 20 kW (27 hp). The Fission Surface Power System will be at the core of the power flow system and provide the only stable method for power generation without environmental factors. The demo reactor is expected to supply 10 kW to the grid, while the full system will provide 40 kW. This will enable the use of In situ resource utilization (ISRU).

In 2025, President Trump signed an executive order titled "Ensuring American Space Superiority". The executive order makes placing nuclear reactors on the lunar surface and in orbit a priority for NASA and American space policy. In March 2026, NASA announced that the development of Lunar Reactor-1 (LR-1), a Fission Surface Power reactor for the moon base, would be informed by the development and launch of Space Reactor-1 Freedom (SR-1) to Mars in December 2028.

In 2024, Roscosmos and the CNSA announced plans to build a nuclear reactor on the moon by 2035 to power their crewed lunar base.

=== Betavoltaic systems ===
Betavoltaic power systems generate electricity from beta particles emitted during radioactive decay, rather than from decay heat as in radioisotope thermoelectric generators. In July 2026, City Labs launched BOHR, a CubeSat demonstration mission carrying its tritium-based NanoTritium betavoltaic micropower source, aboard SpaceX's Transporter-17 rideshare mission. The spacecraft uses conventional solar power for general satellite bus operations, while the NanoTritium system powers and validates the payload demonstration.

== Visuals ==
A gallery of images of space nuclear power systems.

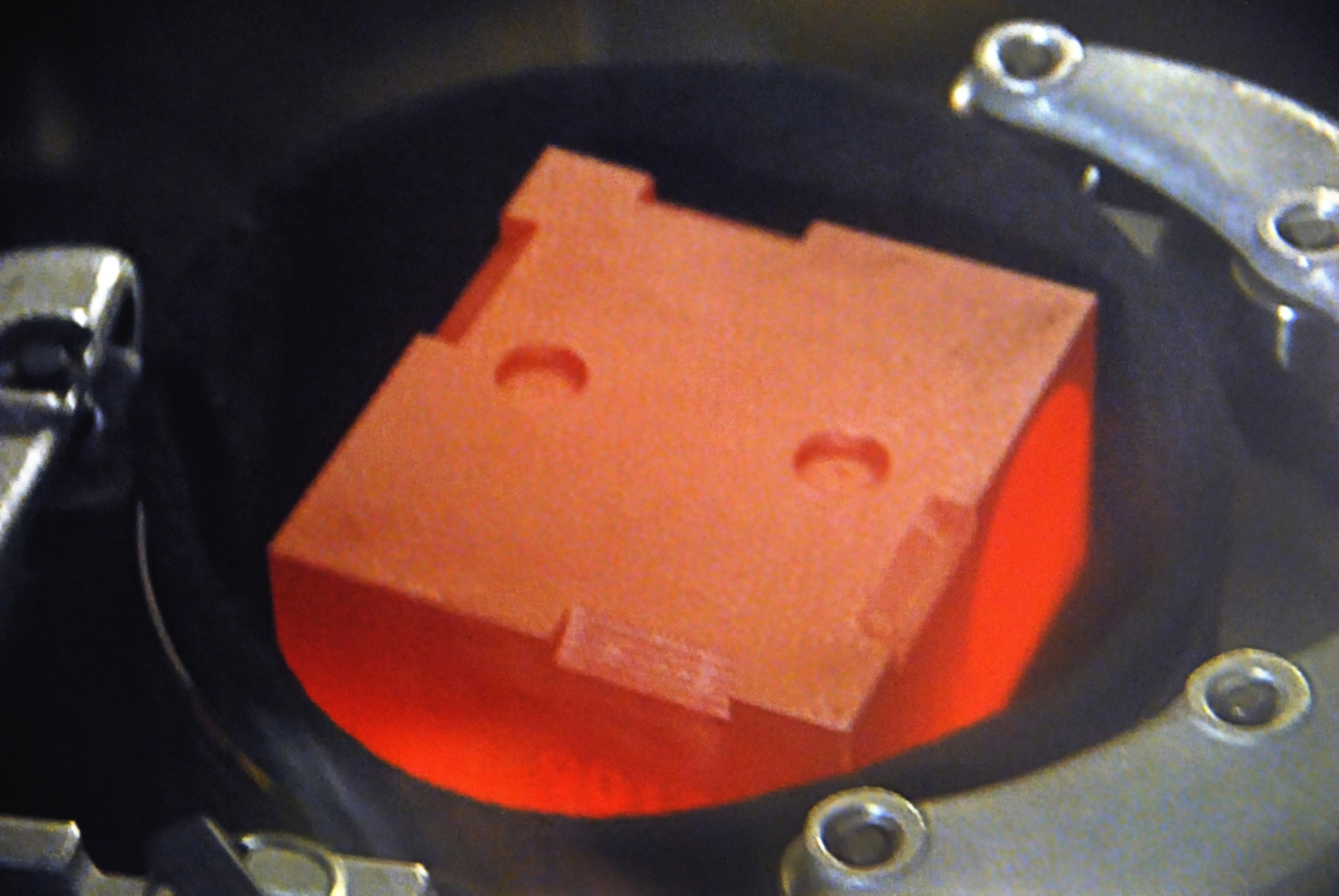
Red-hot shell containing plutonium undergoing nuclear decay, inside the Mars Science Laboratory MMRTG. MSL was launched in 2011 and landed on Mars in August 2012.

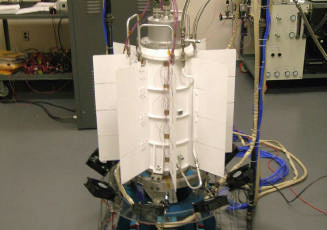
The MSL MMRTG exterior. The white Aptek 2711 coating reflects sunlight while still transmitting heat to the Martian atmosphere

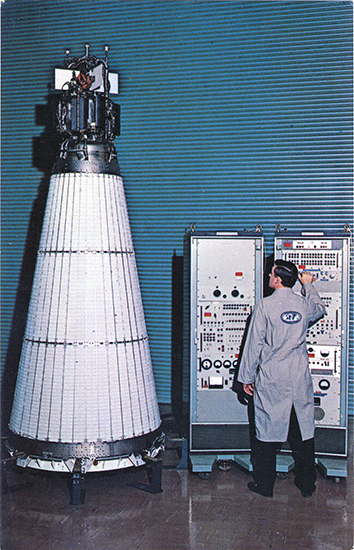
SNAP-10A Space Nuclear Power Plant, shown here in tests on the Earth, launched into orbit in the 1960s.

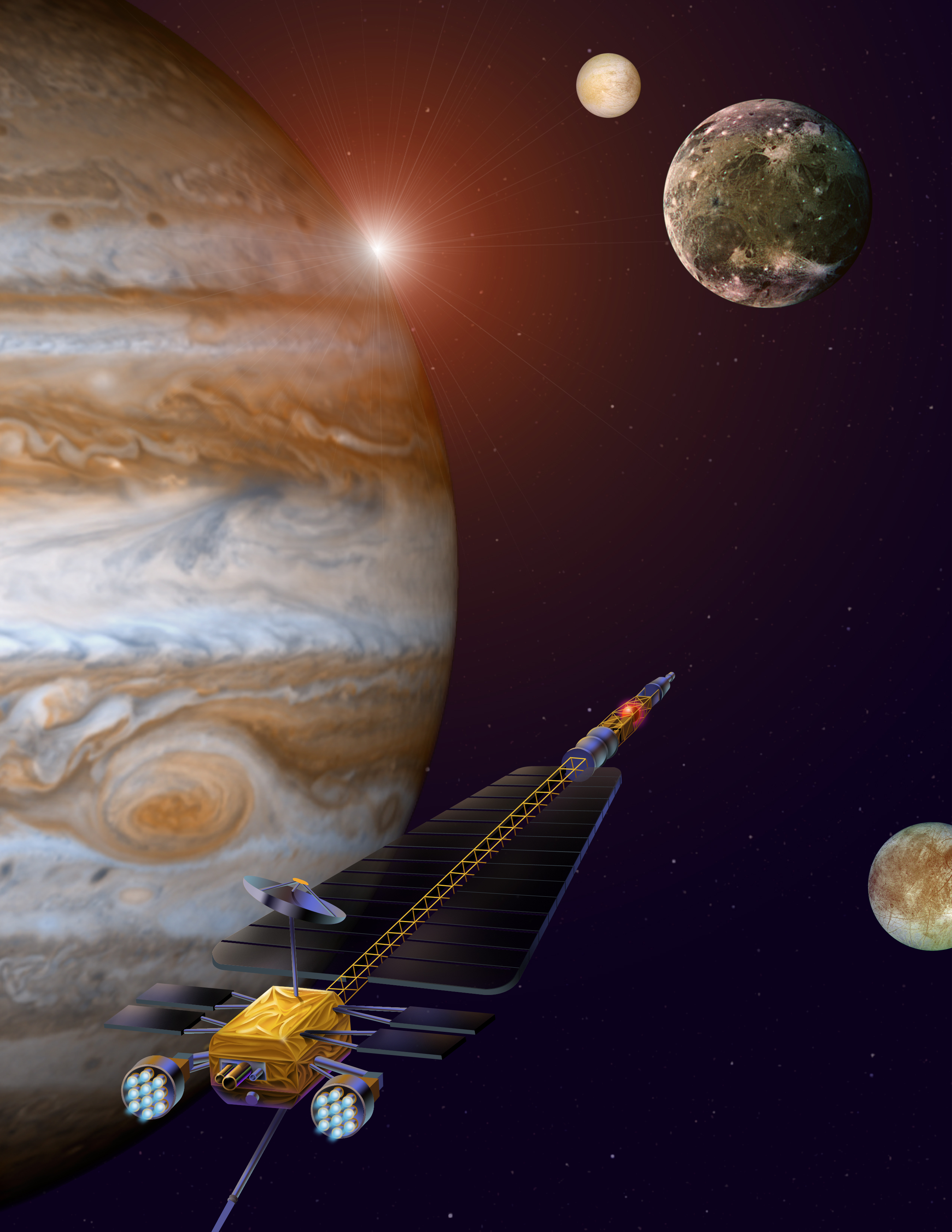
Jupiter Icy Moons Orbiter. A long boom holds the reactor at a distance, while a radiation shadow shield protects the radiator fins

== See also ==
- US-A
- List of nuclear power systems in space
- Radioisotope thermoelectric generator#Nuclear power systems in space
- Austere Human Missions to Mars
- Nuclear pulse propulsion
- Nuclear propulsion
- Nuclear thermal rocket
- Nuclear electric rocket
- Batteries in space
- Solar panels on spacecraft
