= RAPID-L =

The RAPID-L, RAPID-L_{AT} (L: Lunar base, A: Automatic，T: Thermoelectric) is a micro nuclear reactor concept conceived as a powerhouse for colonies on the Moon and Mars. It is based on the RAPID-series (Refueling by All Pins Integrated Design) fast breeder reactor using a liquid lithium-6 design. The study was funded by the Japan Atomic Energy Research Institute (JAERI) in FY 1999–2001. The research was carried out by Japan's Central Research Institute of Electric Power Industry (CRIEPI), Komae Research Laboratory.

== History ==
In 1999, the U.S. Department of Energy (DOE) started the Nuclear Energy Research Initiative (NERI) project (not to confuse with International Nuclear Energy Research Initiative I-NERI from 2001). Its goal was to solicit innovative public research. The theme was to create ultra-safe and ultra-small reactors. Inspired by SP-100, the Alkali Metal Thermoelectric Converter (AMTEC), JAERI's own high-temperature gas-cooled reactor (HTGR) High-temperature engineering test reactor from 1990, and CRIEPI's RAPID & RAPID-A projects from 1993 & 1995 among others JAERI commissioned the RAPID-L study.

The original study looked for an ultra-safe and ultra-small fast reactor RAPID-L_{AT} assumed for use at a Moon base or Mars base. The reason for the assumption of a Mars or Moon base was the closeness of the gravities of both celestial bodies 1/3 and 1/6 of Earth's gravity. The study followed a three-year plan:

- 1999: basic concept; material research
- 2000: experiment of innovative technologies and their feasibility; Fast Critical Assembly (FCA) tests
- 2001: LIM tests; plant dynamics analysis

== Design considerations ==
- Natural circulation was a necessary ability considered for the reactor. As coolant lithium-6 was chosen based on temperature requirement and its boiling point (1615 K=1342 °C) being higher than either Sodium (882 °C) or Potassium (757 °C). Another reason is the generation of Helium gas by reaction (n, α) as well as serving as a neutron absorber. This required the ability to remove and extract Helium.
- A target was the reduction and simplification of the reactor structure to ease In-Service Inspection (ISI). It was determined that an adaption of the RAPID design concept would solve all this. The RAPID concept would also offer unrefueled running times for 20 years and beyond.
- At the time a launch by the Space Shuttle and the H-2 were considered which set a limit to 3.7 m in diameter, 10 m or less in length, and a mass of less than 10 tons. The gravities of the Moon and Mars were also taken into account. It was determined that an elongated furnace structure is required to meet these requirements. As the seismic requirements are relaxed compared on the Earth there was less concern of damage to the structure. A free wavefront design was adopted for the reactor. Further, it was assumed that the transport would be divided into two launches.
- It was assumed that the weight on the Moon would be 670 kg at most and that simple cranes can handle it. Heavy equipment for excavating a 2 x 6 m pit was expected to be available.

== General description ==
The RAPID and RAPID-L designs were developed by the Central Research Institute of Electric Power Industry (CRIEPI) of Japan. The RAPID-L design is a liquid metal fast breeder reactor (LMFBR) concept meant to prevent accidents due to human errors. The goal was to create a long-life core that is inherently safe due to being maintenance free. These were necessary requirements as the reactor was intended to be used on the Moon.

To this end several innovative ideas were adopted

- Heat systems with radiator panel
- An Integrated Fuel Assembly (IFA) to realize quick and simplified refueling
- A 10-years-operation without refueling
- Innovative reactivity control systems without control rods, etc.

The RAPID-L is a thermoelectric power conversion system using uranium-nitride fuel (40% and 50% enriched respectively) and liquid lithium-6 coolant with a 5 MW of thermal energy and 200 kW of electric power. The lithium inlet and outlet are rated for a temperature of 1,030 and 1,100 °C. Lithium-6 also serves as neutron absorber. It is the first reactor of this kind. As lithium-6 has not been used as a neutron absorbing material in conventional fast reactors, measurements were performed at the Fast Critical Assembly (FCA) of Japan Atomic Energy Research Institute (JAERI). The FCA core was composed of highly enriched uranium and stainless steel samples so as to simulate the core spectrum of the RAPID-L. The samples were enriched with 95% lithium-6 and were inserted into the core parallel to the core axis for the measurement of the reactivity at each position. It was found that the measured reactivity in the core region was in agreement with calculations. Bias factors for the core design were obtained by comparing between experimental and calculated results.

As a variant of the RAPID (Refueling by All Pins Integrated Design) fast reactor concept, it can be refueled in a quick and simple manner. Essential for this feature is that the reactor core consists of an Integrated Fuel Assembly (IFA) instead of conventional fuel subassemblies. This small core has 2700 fuel elements (pins) combined by the IFA, consisting of a core support grid and several spacer grids, and are assembled into a fuel cartridge. This cartridge can be replaced as a unit. The reactor can be operated without refueling for up to 10 years (80% nominal power). The reactor has no control rods. To achieve fully automated operation the reactor relies on various reactivity control systems: Lithium Expansion Module (LEM), Lithium Injection Module (LIM) and Lithium Release Module (LRM). LEM serves for inherent reactivity feedback, LIM serves for inherent ultimate shutdown, and LRM serves for automated reactor startup. These passive systems help to mitigate the effects of fuel depletion, allowing a long fuel life. The bias factors were used to determine the number of LEM and LIM needed in the core to achieve fully automated operation.

The reactor has basically a loop type configuration and a reactor container of 2 m in diameter, 6.5 m deep and weighs about 7.6 tons. This RAPID concept has neither diagrid nor core support structure since they are integrated in a fuel cartridge. The simple reactor container would make the most important In-Service Inspection (ISI) easier. An ISI can be conducted for each refueling. The reactor is designed to be installed below grade so that the ground provides the necessary shielding. Separate electromagnetic pumps and the fuel cartridge are connected by the connecting tubes. The reactor subsystem is characterized by the RAPID refueling concept to eliminate conventional fuel handling systems. This gives a substantial reactor block mass savings of 60% over comparable liquid metal cooled fast reactor systems.

== Reactor control ==
Burn-up compensation is achieved automatically by the LEMs, achieving 80% of the nominal power at the end-of-life of the fuel cartridge. The LEM is a thermometer-like device actuated by the volume expansion of the Li^{6}. This “liquid control rod” can keep the reactor power almost constant throughout the design life. Partial load operation is possible by adjusting the primary coolant flow rate. Reactor power will be in proportional with the primary coolant flow rate due to LEMs reactivity feedback. The LRM is composed of an envelope divided by a frozen seal into two chambers. The lower chamber, within the active core, has a 95% enriched Li^{6} reservoir, while the upper chamber is a vacuum prior to reactor startup. Reactor startup can be done automatically if the primary coolant temperature reaches its standby temperature. Coolant heating can be achieved by heat release from the primary pump circulation. Then the frozen seal of the LRM will melt at the hot standby temperature (approximately 780 °C), and Li^{6} is released slowly from lower level (active core level) to the upper level to achieve a positive reactivity increase. It will take 7(11) hours to complete startup. The LIMs assure sufficient negative reactivity feedback in unprotected transients. The LRMs enable an automated reactor startup by detecting the hot standby temperature of the primary coolant. All these systems use Li^{6} and are actuated by highly reliable physical properties (volume expansion of Li^{6} for LEM, and frozen seal melting for LIM and LRM). A configuration with Quick LEMs requires 3+(1) LEMs of smaller size than a configuration with Slow LEMs requiring 24 LEMs. The RAPID-L is equipped with 28 LEMs, 16 LIMs and 16 LRMs in the design concept. Two of the 16 LRM are reserves or dummies. It is a very redundant system. Failure of some of these devices would result in only a slight temperature deviation of the coolant. In case that most of the LEMs fail, the burn-up compensation by the LEMs could be impossible, and the reactor would shut down.

== Reactor installation and launch ==
The reactor can be launched by the H-2 launch vehicle to Low Earth Orbit (LEO) before going to the Moon. Then it will be installed in an excavated cylindrical hole 2 m in diameter and 6 m in depth. The four thermoelectric energy conversion segments and the eight radiator panels are placed around the reactor.

== Toshiba involvement ==
Toshiba has been often cited to be involved in the research and development of the RAPID-L, however, this could not be confirmed in any of the Japanese documentations nor in contemporary science or press news. The Mitsubishi Research Institute，Inc. was the only corporate affiliated listed. The misconception seemed to have appeared when the Toshiba 4S came under preliminary review with the U.S. Nuclear Regulatory Commission in 2007. This may have been first spread by blogs, but eventually found its way into some serious publications and papers.

== See also ==
- SNAP-10A
- Kosmos 954
- Kosmos-1900
- ERATO Propulsion Nucléo-Electrique (ERATO)
- closed cycle magnetohydrodynamic closed cycle magnetohydrodynamic (CCMHD) power generation system
- SP-100
- Alkali Metal Thermoelectric Converter (AMTEC)
- Traveling wave reactor
- Toshiba 4S
- CAREM
- NuScale
- Hyperion nuclear reactor (hydride)
