= SP-100 =

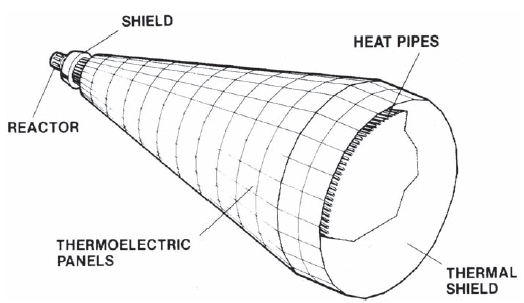
SP-100 nuclear power system

SP-100 (Space reactor Prototype) was a U.S. research program for nuclear fission reactors usable as small fission power systems for spacecraft. It was started in 1983 by NASA, the US Department of Energy and other agencies.

A reactor was developed with heat pipes transporting the heat to thermoelectric generators which would generate 100 kilowatts of electric power, thus the name SP-100. It was cooled with lithium. The project never advanced to flight hardware and was terminated in 1994.

== See also ==
- Systems Nuclear Auxiliary Power Program and SNAP-10A, that flew in 1965
- Safe Affordable Fission Engine, a later project
- Kilopower, a later small space reactor
