= Safe affordable fission engine =

Experimental fission reactors for use in space

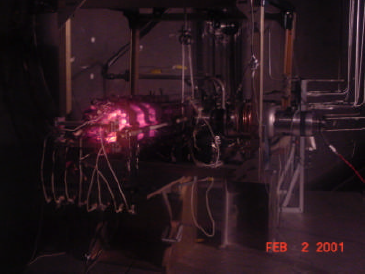
SAFE-30 small experimental reactor

Safe affordable fission engine (SAFE) were NASA's small experimental nuclear fission reactors for electricity production in space. Most known was the SAFE-400 reactor concept intended to produce 400 kW thermal and 100 kW electrical using a Brayton cycle closed-cycle gas turbine. The fuel was uranium nitride in a core of 381 pins clad with rhenium. Three fuel pins surround a molybdenum–sodium heatpipe that transports the heat to a heatpipe-gas heat exchanger. This was called a heatpipe power system. The reactor was about 50 centimetres (20 in) tall, 30 centimetres (12 in) across and weighed about 512 kilograms (1,129 lb). It was developed at the Los Alamos National Laboratory and the Marshall Space Flight Center under the lead of Dave Poston. A smaller test reactor called SAFE-30 was first built.

The working fluid used in the reactor was a helium–xenon gas mixture.

The project was funded with discretionary money in the lab's budget and done mostly outside the researchers' normal work.

As of 2019, this project appears to have been superseded by Nasa's Kilopower.

== See also ==
- Kilopower
- Systems Nuclear Auxiliary Power Program and SNAP-10A, that flew in 1965
- SP-100
