= Stirling radioisotope generator =

Type of atomic battery

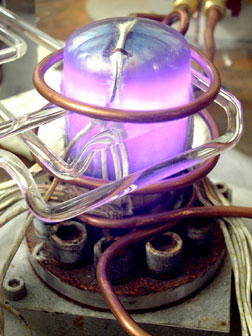
Component of Stirling radioisotope generator is heated by induction during testing

A Stirling radioisotope generator (SRG) is a type of radioisotope generator based on a Stirling engine powered by a large radioisotope heater unit. The hot end of the Stirling converter reaches high temperature and heated helium drives the piston, with heat being rejected at the cold end of the engine. A generator or alternator converts the motion into electricity. Given the very constrained supply of plutonium, the Stirling converter is notable for producing about four times as much electric power from the plutonium fuel as compared to a radioisotope thermoelectric generator (RTG).

The Stirling generators were extensively tested on Earth by NASA, but their development was cancelled in 2013 before they could be deployed on actual spacecraft missions. A similar NASA project still under development, called Kilopower, also utilizes Stirling engines, but uses a small uranium fission reactor as the heat source.

== History ==
Stirling and Brayton-cycle technology development has been conducted at NASA Glenn Research Center (formerly NASA Lewis) since the early 1970s. The Space Demonstrator Engine (SPDE) was the earliest 12.5 kWe per cylinder engine that was designed, built and tested. A later engine of this size, the Component Test Power Converter (CTPC), used a "Starfish" heat-pipe heater head, instead of the pumped-loop used by the SPDE. In the 1992-93 time period, this work was stopped due to the termination of the related SP-100 nuclear power system work and NASA's new emphasis on "better, faster, cheaper" systems and missions.

In 2020, a free-piston Stirling power converter reached 15 years of maintenance-free and degradation-free cumulative operation in the Stirling Research Laboratory at NASA Glenn. This duration equals the operational design life of the MMRTG, and is representative of typical mission concepts designed to explore the outer planets or even more distant Kuiper Belt Objects. This unit, called the Technology Demonstration Converter (TDC) #13, is the oldest of several converters that have shown no signs of degradation. Since 2017, the NASA Radioisotope Power Systems Program at NASA Glenn has continued developing several candidate technologies for the first dynamic RPS to fly in space, including designs based on the record-setting TDC #13 and the gas-bearing-based Stirling converter that was used in the ASRG. A small turbo-Brayton system is also under technology development. Several viable generator designs in the range of 100-500 Watts have emerged from the ongoing dynamic conversion technology development effort. In the near-term, a lunar demonstration mission using a dynamic RPS as part of NASA's Artemis Program could be the first opportunity for a DRPS to be used in spaceflight. The use of DRPS in a lunar-landed payload would enable it to survive and operate productively during the frigidly cold, two-week lunar nights, or in permanently shadowed craters near the moon's poles.

In the early 21st century, a major project using this concept was undertaken: the Advanced Stirling Radioisotope Generator (ASRG), a power source based on a 55-watt electric converter. The thermal power source for this system was the General Purpose Heat Source (GPHS). Each GPHS contained four iridium-clad Pu-238 fuel pellets, stood 5 cm tall and 10 cm square, and weighed 1.44 kg. The hot end of the Stirling converter reached 650 °C and heated helium drove a free piston reciprocating in a linear alternator, heat being rejected at the cold end of the engine. The alternating current (AC) generated by the alternator was then converted to 55 watts direct current (DC). Each ASRG unit would use two Stirling converter units with about 500 watts of thermal power supplied by two GPHS units and would deliver 100-120 watts of electric power. The ASRG underwent qualification testing at NASA Glenn as a power supply for a future NASA mission.

The ASRG was designed into many mission proposals in this era, but was cancelled in 2013, due to NASA budget constraints.

== See also ==
- Advanced Stirling radioisotope generator
- Radioisotope heater unit
- Radioisotope thermoelectric generator
