= GPHS-RTG =

Model of long-lasting electric power source used on NASA space probes

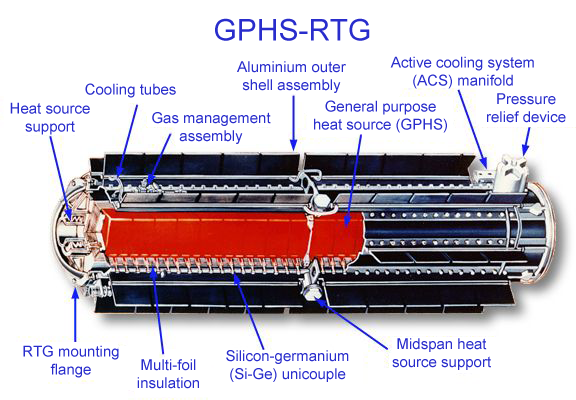
Diagram of an RTG used on the Cassini probe

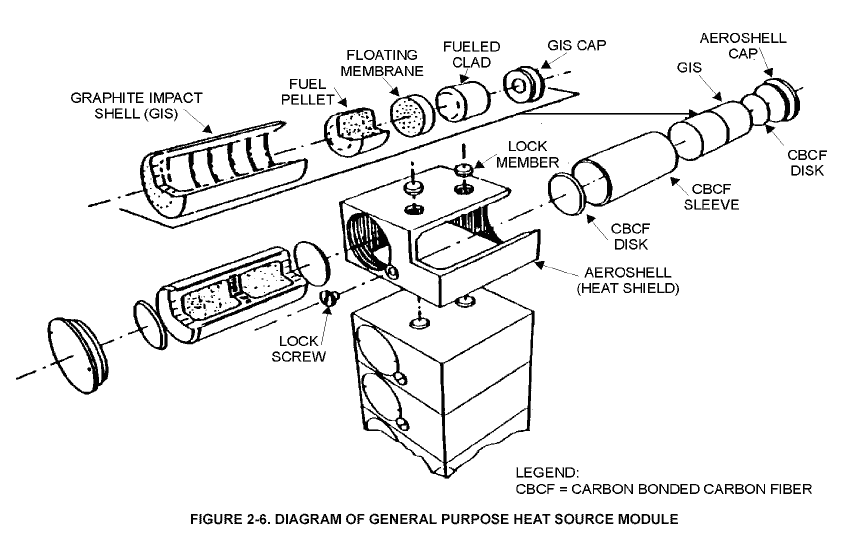
Diagram of a stack of general-purpose heat source modules as used in RTGs

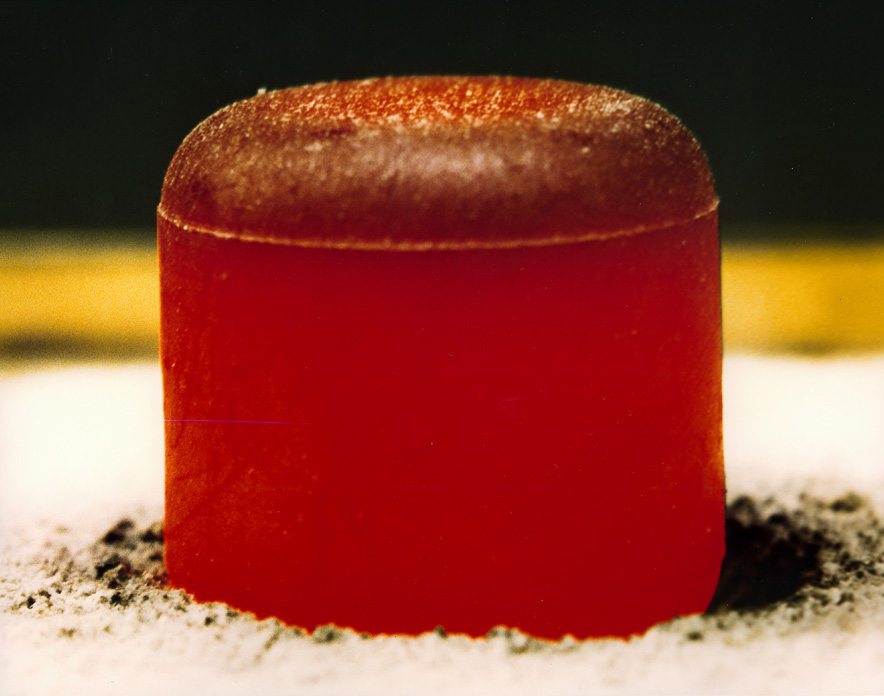
Image of a plutonium RTG pellet glowing red hot.

GPHS-RTG or general-purpose heat source — radioisotope thermoelectric generator, is a specific design of the radioisotope thermoelectric generator (RTG) used on US space missions. The GPHS-RTG was used on Ulysses (1), Galileo (2), Cassini-Huygens (3), and New Horizons (1).

The GPHS-RTG has an overall diameter of 0.422 m and a length of 1.14 m. Each GPHS-RTG has a mass of about 57 kg and generates about 300 watts of electrical power at the start of mission (5.2 We/kg), using about 8.1 kg of Pu-238 which produces about 4,400 watts of thermal power. The plutonium oxide fuel is in 18 GPHSs. Note that the GPHS are cuboid although they contain cylindrical plutonium based pellets.

The GPHS-RTG units used on spacecraft were not created by NASA. They were designed and built by General Electric Space Division (later part of Martin-Marietta, subsequently part of Lockheed Martin), in King of Prussia, Pennsylvania. The generators were filled with plutonium by Department of Energy laboratories in Miamisburg, Ohio and Idaho Falls, Idaho.

After the Ulysses and Galileo RTGs were fueled, their launches were postponed by four and three years respectively. As a result, the missions were slightly adapted to utilize the lower power that would be available. The decay heat reduces by about 0.8% per year, so the thermoelectric converter 'ages' or degrades to some extent.

The thermoelectric elements convert the heat energy from the isotope into electricity. The GPHS-RTG use SiGe thermoelectric elements ('Unicouples') which are no longer in production. Missions after 2010 requiring RTGs, such as the Mars Science Laboratory, use the Multi-Mission Radioisotope Thermoelectric Generators instead.

== GPHS-RTG missions ==
- Ulysses, mission completed 2007 in heliocentric orbit (orbiting the Sun)
- Galileo, mission completed 2003 entry into planet Jupiter
- Cassini, mission completed 2017 entry into planet Saturn
- New Horizons, mission ongoing departing Solar System (escape trajectory)

== See also ==
- Nuclear power in space
