= Advanced Stirling radioisotope generator =

Power system for use on spacecraft

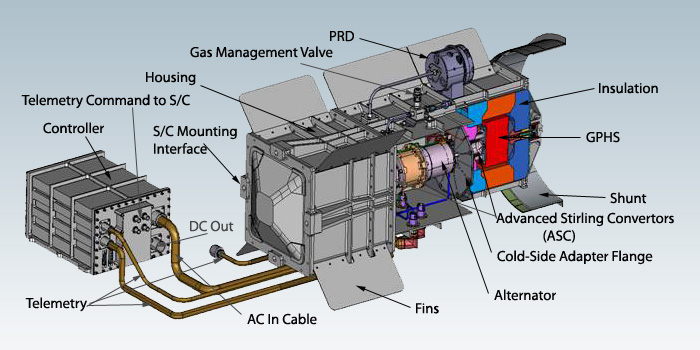
Cutaway diagram of the advanced Stirling radioisotope generator

The advanced Stirling radioisotope generator (ASRG) is a radioisotope power system first developed at NASA's Glenn Research Center. It uses a Stirling power conversion technology to convert radioactive-decay heat into electricity for use on spacecraft. The energy conversion process used by an ASRG is significantly more efficient than previous radioisotope systems, using one quarter of the plutonium-238 to produce the same amount of power.

Despite termination of the ASRG flight development contract in 2013, NASA continues a small investment testing by private companies. Flight-ready Stirling-based units are not expected before 2028.

== Development ==
Development was undertaken in 2000 under joint sponsorship by the United States Department of Energy (DoE), Lockheed Martin Space Systems, and the Stirling Research Laboratory at NASA's Glenn Research Center (GRC) for potential future space missions.

In 2012, NASA chose a solar-powered mission (InSight) for the Discovery 12 interplanetary mission, negating the need for a radioisotope power system for the 2018 launch.

The DOE cancelled the Lockheed contract in late 2013, after the cost had risen to over $260 million, $110 million more than originally expected. It was also decided to make use of remaining program hardware in constructing and testing a second engineering unit (for testing and research), which was completed in August 2014 in a close-out phase and shipped to GRC. Testing done in 2015 showed power fluctuations after just 175 hr of operation, becoming more frequent and larger in magnitude.

NASA also needed more funding for continued plutonium-238 production (which will be used in existing MMRTGs for long-range probes in the meantime) and decided to use the savings from the ASRG cancellation to do so rather than take funding from science missions.

Despite termination of the ASRG flight development contract, NASA continues a small investment testing Stirling converter technologies developed by Sunpower Inc. and Infinia Corporation, in addition to the unit supplied by Lockheed and a variable-conductance heat pipe supplied by Advanced Cooling Technologies, Inc. Flight-ready units based on Stirling technology are not expected until 2028.

== Specifications ==
The higher conversion efficiency of the Stirling cycle compared with that of radioisotope thermoelectric generators (RTGs) used in previous missions (Viking, Pioneer, Voyager, Galileo, Ulysses, Cassini, New Horizons, Mars Science Laboratory, and Mars 2020) would have offered an advantage of a fourfold reduction in PuO_{2} fuel, at half the mass of an RTG. It would have produced 140 watts of electricity using a quarter of the plutonium an RTG or MMRTG needs.

The two finished units had these expected specifications:

- ≥14-year lifetime
- Nominal power: 130 W
- Mass: 32 kg (71 lb)
- System efficiency: ≈ 26%
- Total mass of plutonium-238-dioxide: 1.2 kg (2.6 lb)
- Plutonium housed in two General Purpose Heat Source (“Pu^{238} Bricks”) modules
- Dimensions: 76 cm × 46 cm × 39 cm (2.5 ft × 1.5 ft × 1.3 ft)

== Flight proposals ==
ASRGs could be installed on a wide variety of vehicles, from orbiters, landers and rovers to balloons and planetary boats. A spacecraft proposed to use this generator was the TiME boat-lander mission to Titan, the largest moon of the planet Saturn, with a launch intended for January 2015, or 2023. In February 2009 it was announced that NASA/ESA had given Europa Jupiter System Mission (EJSM/Laplace) mission priority ahead of the Titan Saturn System Mission (TSSM), which could have included TiME. In August 2012, TiME also lost the 2016 Discovery class competition to the InSight Mars lander.

The Herschel Orbital Reconnaissance of the Uranian System (HORUS) mission was proposing to use three ASRGs to power an orbiter for the Uranian system. Another Uranus probe concept using the ASRG was MUSE which has been evaluated as both an ESA L-Class mission and New Frontiers enhanced mission. The Jupiter Europa Orbiter mission proposed using four ASRG to power an orbiter in the Jovian system. Another possibility was the Mars Geyser Hopper.

It was proposed in 2013 to fly three ASRG units on board the FIRE probe to study Jupiter's moon Io for the New Frontiers program Mission 4.

== See also ==
- Nuclear power in space
- Radioisotope heater unit
- Stirling engine
- Stirling radioisotope generator
