= Kilopower =

NASA project aimed at producing a nuclear reactor for space

Kilopower reactor
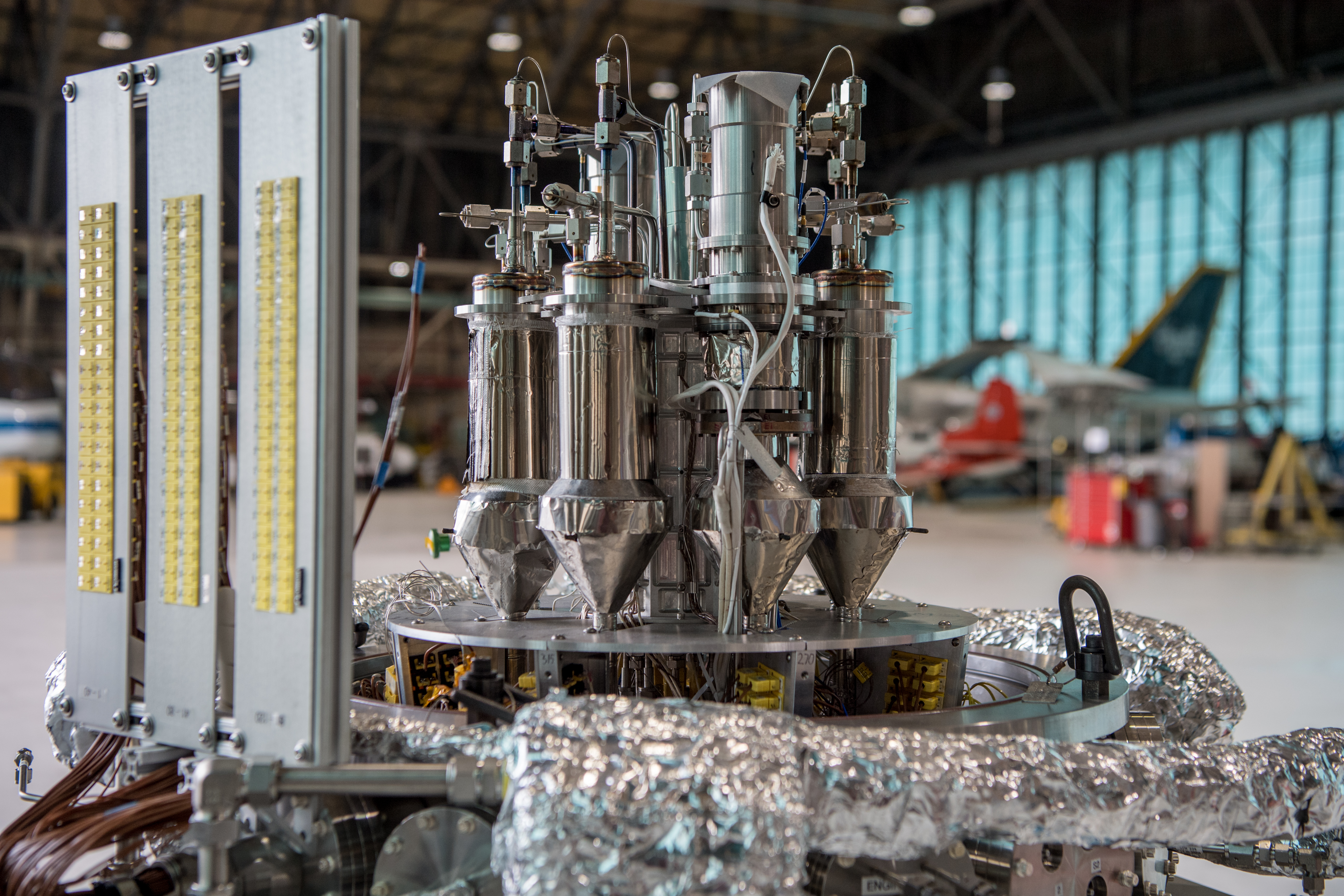
- Prototype NASA 1kW Kilopower nuclear reactor for use in space and planet surfaces
- Generation: Experimental
- Reactor concept: Stirling engine
- Status: In development

Main parameters of the reactor core
- Fuel (fissile material): HEU: ^{235}U
- Fuel state: Solid (cast cylinder)
- Primary control method: Boron carbide control rod
- Neutron reflector: Beryllium oxide radial reflector
- Primary coolant: Sodium heat pipes

Reactor usage
- Primary use: Long-duration space missions
- Power (thermal): 4.3–43.3 kW_{th}
- Power (electric): 1–10 kW
- Website: www.nasa.gov/directorates/spacetech/kilopower

Kilopower is an experimental U.S. project to make new nuclear reactors for space travel. The project started in October 2015, led by NASA and the DoE’s National Nuclear Security Administration (NNSA). As of 2017, the Kilopower reactors were intended to come in four sizes, able to produce from one to ten kilowatts of electrical power (1–10 kW_{e}) continuously for twelve to fifteen years. The fission reactor uses uranium-235 to generate heat that is carried to the Stirling converters with passive sodium heat pipes. In 2018, positive test results for the Kilopower Reactor Using Stirling Technology (KRUSTY) demonstration reactor were announced.

Potential applications include nuclear electric propulsion and a steady electricity supply for crewed or robotic space missions that require large amounts of power, especially where sunlight is limited or not available. NASA has also studied the Kilopower reactor as the power supply for crewed Mars missions. During those missions, the reactor would provide power for the machinery necessary to separate and cryogenically store oxygen from the Martian atmosphere for ascent vehicle propellants. Once humans arrive the reactor would power their life-support systems and other requirements. NASA studies have shown that a 40 kW_{e} reactor would be sufficient to support a crew of between 4 and 6 astronauts.

== Description ==
The reactor is fueled by an alloy of 93% uranium-235 and 7% molybdenum. The core of the reactor is a solid cast alloy structure surrounded by a beryllium oxide reflector, which prevents neutrons from escaping the reactor core and allows the chain reaction to continue. The reflector also reduces the emissions of gamma radiation that could impair on-board electronics. A uranium core has the benefit of avoiding uncertainty in the supply of other radioisotopes, such as plutonium-238, that are used in RTGs.

The prototype KRUSTY 1 kW_{e} Kilopower reactor weighs 134 kg and contains 28 kg of ^{235}U. The space-rated 10 kW_{e} Kilopower for Mars is expected to have a mass of 1500 kg in total (with a 226 kg core) and contain 43.7 kg of ^{235}U.

Nuclear reaction control is provided by a single rod of boron carbide, which is a neutron absorber. The reactor is intended to be launched cold, preventing the formation of highly radioactive fission products. Once the reactor reaches its destination, the neutron absorbing boron rod is removed to allow the nuclear chain reaction to start. Once the reaction is initiated, decay of a series of fission products cannot be stopped completely. However, the depth of control rod insertion provides a mechanism to adjust the rate of the uranium fission, allowing the heat output to match the load.

Passive heat pipes filled with liquid sodium transfer the reactor core heat to one or more free-piston Stirling engines, which produce reciprocating motion to drive a linear electric generator. The melting point of sodium is 98 °C (208 °F), which means that liquid sodium can flow freely at high temperatures between about 400 and 700 °C (750 and 1,300 °F). Nuclear fission cores typically operate at about 600 °C (1,100 °F).

The reactor is designed to be intrinsically safe in a wide range of environments and scenarios. Several feedback mechanisms are employed to mitigate a nuclear meltdown. The primary method is passive cooling, which requires no mechanical mechanisms to circulate coolant. The reactor design is self-regulating through design geometry that creates a negative temperature reactivity coefficient. In effect this means that as the power demand increases the temperature of the reactor drops. This causes it to shrink, preventing neutrons from leaking out. This in turn causes reactivity to increase and power output to increase to meet the demand. This also works in reverse at times of lower power demand.

== Demonstration Using Flattop Fissions ==
The development of Kilopower began with an experiment called DUFF or Demonstration Using Flattop Fissions, which was tested in September 2012 using the existing Flattop assembly as a nuclear heat source. When DUFF was tested at the Device Assembly Facility at the Nevada Test Site, it became the first Stirling engine powered by fission energy and the first use of a heat pipe to transport heat from a reactor to a power conversion system. According to David Poston, the leader of the Compact Fission Reactor Design Team, and Patrick McClure, the manager for small nuclear reactor projects at Los Alamos National Laboratory, the DUFF experiment showed that "for low-power reactor systems, nuclear testing can be accomplished with reasonable cost and schedule within the existing infrastructure and regulatory environment".

== KRUSTY testing and first fission ==
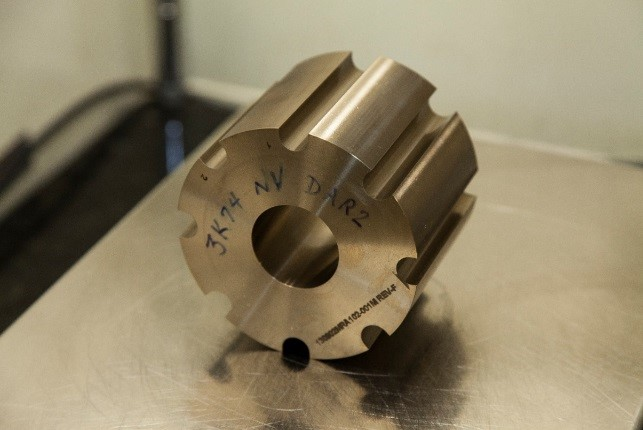
The depleted uranium mockup core, manufactured at Y-12 for the KRUSTY experiment.

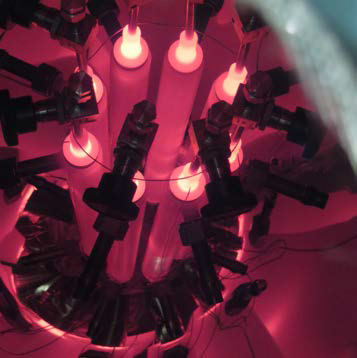
Heat pipes of KRUSTY during an electrical-heating test

In 2017, the KRUSTY test reactor was completed. KRUSTY is designed to produce up to 1 kilowatt of electric power and is about 6.5 feet tall (1.9 meters). The goal of the test reactor is to closely match the operational parameters that would be required in NASA deep space missions. The first tests used a depleted uranium core manufactured by Y-12 National Security Complex in Oak Ridge, Tennessee. The depleted uranium core is exactly the same material as the regular high-enriched uranium (HEU) core with the only difference being the level of uranium enrichment.

The prototype Kilopower uses a solid, cast uranium-235 reactor core, about the size of a paper towel roll. Reactor heat is transferred via passive sodium heat pipes, with the heat being converted to electricity by Stirling engines. Testing to gain technology readiness level (TRL) 5 started in November 2017 and continued into 2018. The testing of KRUSTY represents the first time the United States has conducted ground tests on any space reactor since the SNAP-10A experimental reactor was tested and eventually flown in 1965.

During November 2017 through March 2018, testing of KRUSTY was conducted at Nevada National Security Site. The tests included thermal, materials, and component validation, and culminated in a successful fission trial at full power. Various faults in the supporting equipment were simulated to ensure the reactor could respond safely.

The KRUSTY reactor was run at full power on March 20, 2018 during a 28-hour test using a 28 kg uranium-235 reactor core. It reached 850 °C (1,560 °F) and generated about 5.5 kW of fission power. The test evaluated failure scenarios including shutting down the Stirling engines, adjusting the control rod, thermal cycling, and disabling the heat-removal system. A scram test concluded the experiment. The test was considered to be a highly successful demonstration.

== See also ==
- Advanced Stirling radioisotope generator – Power system for use on spacecraft
- Nuclear power in space – Space exploration using nuclear energy
- Radioisotope thermoelectric generator – Electrical generator that uses heat from radioactive decay
- RAPID-L
- Small modular reactor – Type of nuclear fission reactor
- SNAP-10A – Experimental nuclear-powered US Air Force satellite
