= Systems for Nuclear Auxiliary Power =

1960s NASA program which developed and tested nuclear reactors for satellites

The Systems Nuclear Auxiliary POWER (SNAP) program (also "Space Nuclear Auxiliary Power" program) was a program of experimental radioisotope thermoelectric generators (RTGs) and space nuclear reactors flown during the 1960s by NASA.

The SNAP program developed as a result of Project Feedback, a RAND Corporation study of reconnaissance satellites completed in 1954. As some of the proposed satellites had high power demands, some as high as a few kilowatts, the U.S. Atomic Energy Commission (AEC) requested a series of nuclear power-plant studies from industry in 1951. Completed in 1952, these studies determined that nuclear power plants were technically feasible for use on satellites.

In 1955, the AEC began two parallel SNAP nuclear power projects. One, contracted with The Martin Company, used radio-isotopic decay as the power source for its generators. These plants were given odd-numbered SNAP designations beginning with SNAP-1. The other project used nuclear reactors to generate energy, and was developed by the Atomics International Division of North American Aviation. Their systems were given even-numbered SNAP designations, the first being SNAP-2.

Most of the systems development and reactor testing was conducted at the Santa Susana Field Laboratory, Ventura County, California using a number of specialized facilities.

== Odd-numbered SNAPs: radioisotope thermoelectric generators ==
Radioisotope thermoelectric generators use the heat of radioactive decay to produce electricity.

=== SNAP-1 ===
SNAP-1 was a test platform that was never deployed, using cerium-144 in a Rankine cycle with mercury as the heat transfer fluid. Operated successfully for 2500 hours.

=== SNAP-3 ===
SNAP-3 was the first RTG used in a space mission (1961). Launched aboard U.S. Navy Transit 4A and 4B navigation satellites. The electrical output of this RTG was 2.5 watts.

=== SNAP-7 ===
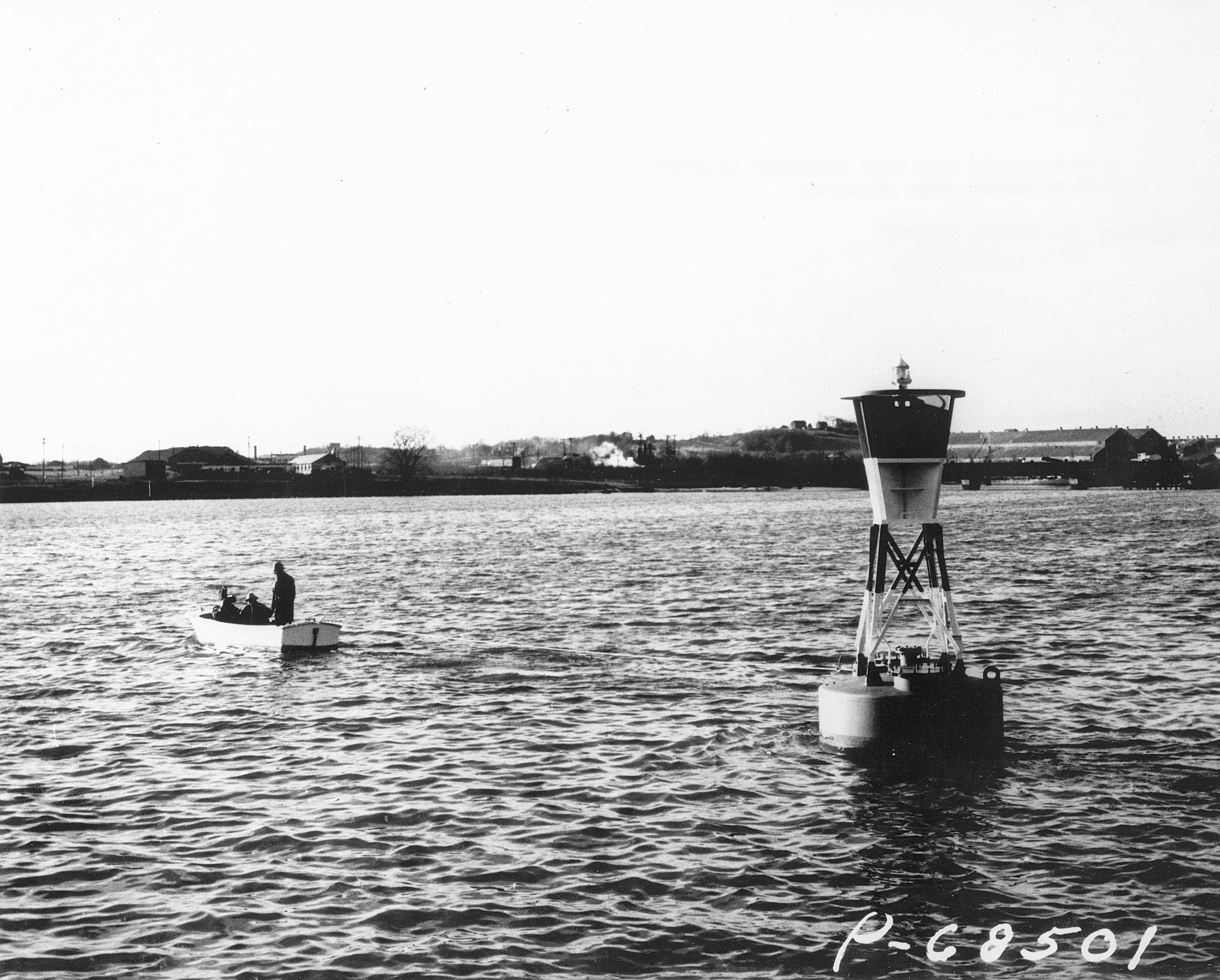
Navigation buoy near Baltimore with a flashing light powered by a SNAP 7A

SNAP-7A, D and F was designed for marine applications such as lighthouses and buoys; at least six units were deployed in the mid-1960s, with names SNAP-7A through SNAP-7F. SNAP-7D produced thirty watts of electricity using 225 kilocuries (8.3 PBq) (about four kilograms) of strontium-90 as SrTiO_{3}. These were very large units, weighing between 1,870 and 6,000 pounds (850 and 2,720 kg).

=== SNAP-9 ===
After SNAP-3 on Transit 4A/B, SNAP-9A units served aboard many of the Transit satellite series. In April 1964 a SNAP-9A failed to achieve orbit and disintegrated, dispersing roughly 1 kilogram (2.2 lb) of plutonium-238 over all continents. Most plutonium fell in the southern hemisphere. Estimated 630 TBq or 2100 person-Sv of radiation was released.

=== SNAP-11 ===
SNAP-11 was an experimental RTG intended to power the Surveyor probes during the lunar night. The curium-242 RTGs would have produced 25 watts of electricity using 900 watts of thermal energy for 130 days. The hot junction temperature was 925 °F (496 °C; 769 K), the cold junction temperature was 350 °F (177 °C; 450 K). They had a liquid NaK thermal control system and a movable shutter to dump excess heat. They were not used on the Surveyor missions.

In general, the SNAP 11 fuel block is a cylindrical multi-material unit which occupies the internal volume of the generator. TZM (molybdenum alloy) fuel capsule, fueled with curium-242 (Cm_{2}O_{3} in an iridium matrix) is located in the center of the fuel block. Capsule is surrounded by a platinum sphere, approximately 2 1/4 inches in diameter, which provides shielding and acts as an energy absorber for impact considerations. This assembly is enclosed in graphite and beryllium sub-assemblies to provide the proper thermal distribution and ablative protection.

=== SNAP-19 ===
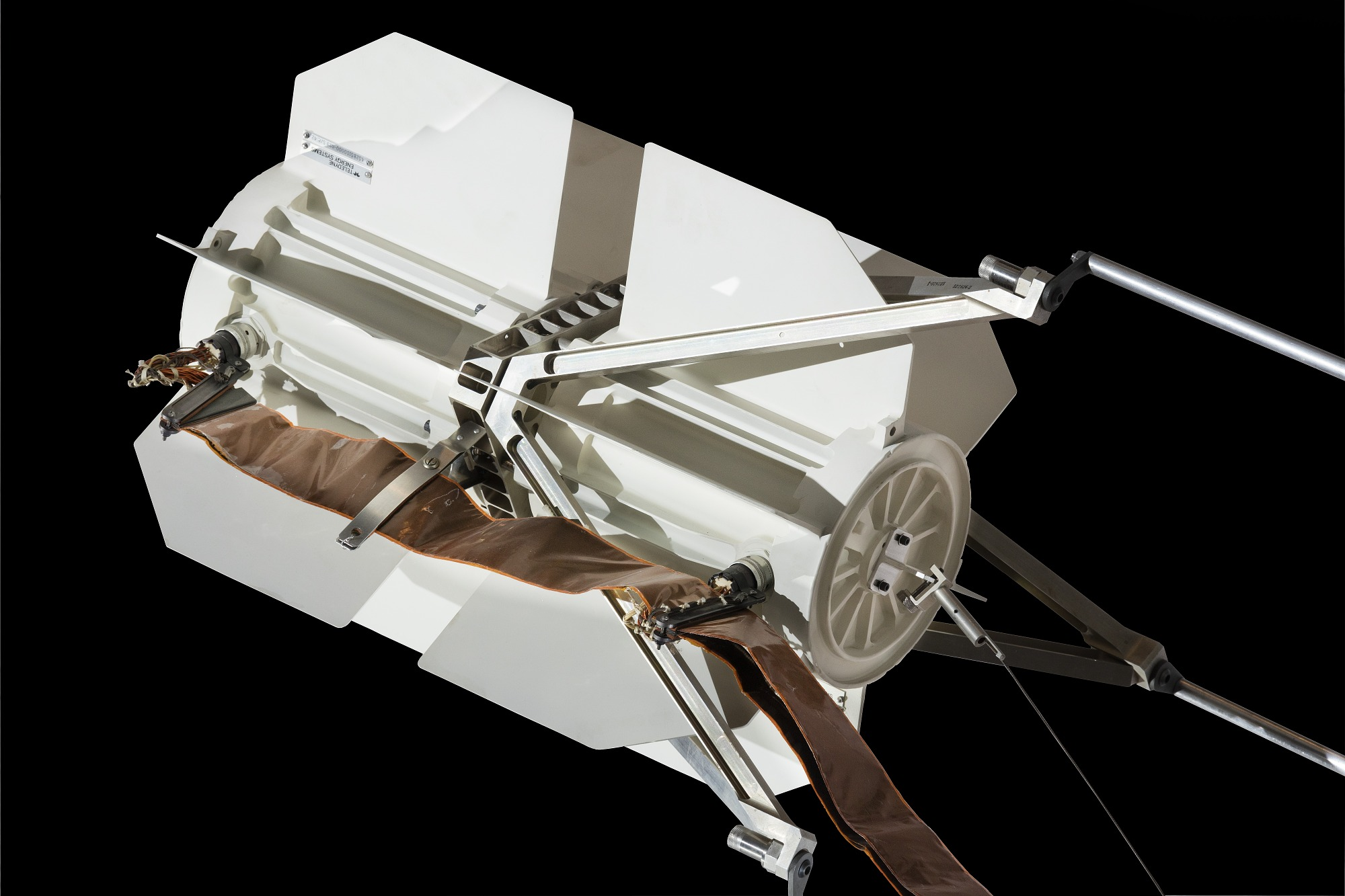
SNAP-19 on a Pioneer 10/11 replica

SNAP-19(B) was developed for the Nimbus-B satellite by the Nuclear Division of the Martin-Marietta Company (now Teledyne Energy Systems). Fueled with ^{238}Pu, two parallel lead telluride thermocouple generators produced an initial maximum of approximately 30 watts of electricity. Nimbus 3 used a SNAP-19B with the recovered fuel from the Nimbus-B1 attempt.

SNAP-19's powered the Pioneer 10 and Pioneer 11 missions. They used n-type 2N-PbTe and p-type TAGS-85 thermoelectric elements.

Modified SNAP-19B's were used for the Viking 1 and Viking 2 landers.

A SNAP-19C was used to power a telemetry array at Nanda Devi in Uttarakhand for a failed CIA operation to track Chinese missile launches.

=== SNAP-21 and 23 ===
SNAP-21 and SNAP-23 were designed for underwater use and used strontium-90 as the radioactive source, encapsulated as either strontium oxide or strontium titanate. They produced about ten watts of electricity.

=== SNAP-27 ===
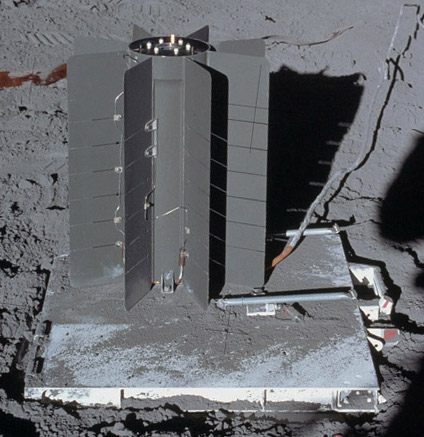
SNAP-27 on the Moon.

Five SNAP-27 units provided electric power for the Apollo Lunar Surface Experiments Packages (ALSEP) left on the Moon by Apollo 12, 14, 15, 16, and 17. The SNAP-27 power supply weighed about 20 kilograms, was 46 cm long and 40.6 cm in diameter. It consisted of a central fuel capsule surrounded by concentric rings of thermocouples. Outside of the thermocouples was a set of fins to provide for heat rejection from the cold side of the thermocouple. Each of the SNAP devices produced approximately 75 W of electrical power at 30 VDC. The energy source for each device was a rod of plutonium-238 providing a thermal power of approximately 1250 W. This fuel capsule, containing 3.8 kilograms (8.4 lb) of plutonium-238 in oxide form (44,500 Ci or 1.65 PBq), was carried to the Moon in a separate fuel cask attached to the side of the Lunar Module. The fuel cask provided thermal insulation and added structural support to the fuel capsule. On the Moon, the Lunar Module pilot removed the fuel capsule from the cask and inserted it in the RTG.

These stations transmitted information about moonquakes and meteor impacts, lunar magnetic and gravitational fields, the Moon's internal temperature, and the Moon's atmosphere for several years after the missions. After ten years, a SNAP-27 produced more than 90% of its initial output of 75 watts.

The fuel cask from the SNAP-27 unit carried by the Apollo 13 mission currently lies in 20,000 feet (6,100 m) of water at the bottom of the Tonga Trench in the Pacific Ocean. This mission failed to land on the Moon, and the lunar module carrying its generator burnt up during re-entry into the Earth's atmosphere, with the trajectory arranged so that the cask would land in the trench. The cask survived re-entry, as it was designed to do, and no release of plutonium has been detected. The corrosion resistant materials of the capsule are expected to contain it for 10 half-lives (870 years).

== Even-numbered SNAPs: compact nuclear reactors ==
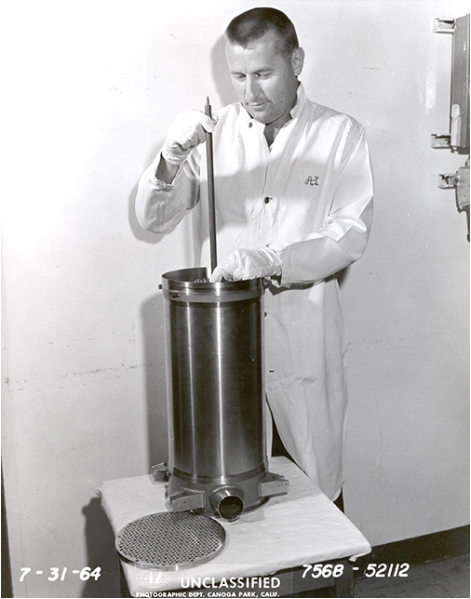
Assembly of the SNAP 8 DR nuclear reactor core.

A series of compact nuclear reactors intended for space use, the even numbered SNAPs were developed for the U.S. government by the Atomics International division of North American Aviation.

=== SNAP Experimental Reactor (SER) ===
The SNAP Experimental Reactor (SER) was the first reactor to be built by the specifications established for space satellite applications. The SER used uranium zirconium hydride as the fuel and eutectic sodium-potassium alloy (NaK) as the coolant and operated at approximately 50 kW thermal. The system did not have a power conversion but used a secondary heat air blast system to dissipate the heat to the atmosphere. The SER used a similar reactor reflector moderator device as the SNAP-10A but with only one reflector. Criticality was achieved in September 1959 with final shutdown completed in December 1961. The project was considered a success. It gave continued confidence in the development of the SNAP Program and it also led to in depth research and component development.

=== SNAP-2 ===
The SNAP-2 Developmental Reactor was the second SNAP reactor built. This device used Uranium-zirconium hydride fuel and had a design reactor power of 55 kW_{t}. It was the first model to use a flight control assembly and was tested from April 1961 to December 1962. The basic concept was that nuclear power would be a long term source of energy for crewed space capsules. However, the crew capsule had to be shielded from deadly radiation streaming from the nuclear reactor. Surrounding the reactor with a radiation shield was out of the question. It would be far too heavy to launch with the rockets available at that time. To protect the "crew" and "payload", the SNAP-2 system used a "shadow shield". The shield was a truncated cone containing lithium hydride. The reactor was at the small end and the crew capsule/payload was in the shadow of the large end.

Studies were performed on the reactor, individual components and the support system. Atomics International, a division of North American Aviation did the development and testing work. The SNAP-2 Shield Development unit was responsible for developing the radiation shield. Creating the shield meant melting lithium hydride and casting it into the form required. The form was a big truncated cone. Molten lithium hydride had to be poured into the casting mold a little at a time; otherwise it would crack as it cooled and solidified. Cracks in the shield material would be fatal to any space crew or payload depending on it because it would allow radiation to stream through to the crew/payload compartment. As the material cooled, it would form kind of a hollowed vortex in the middle. The development engineers had to create ways to fill the vortex while maintaining the shield's integrity. And, in doing all this they had to keep in mind that they were working with a material that could be explosively unstable in a moist oxygen rich environment. Analysis also revealed that under thermal and radiation gradients, the lithium hydride could disassociate and hydrogen ions could migrate through the shield. This would produce variations of shielding efficacy and could subject the payloads to intense radiation. Efforts were made to mitigate these effects.

The SNAP 2DR used a similar reactor reflector moderator device as the SNAP-10A but with two movable and internal fixed reflectors. The system was designed so that the reactor could be integrated with a mercury Rankine cycle to generate 3.5 kW of electricity.

=== SNAP-8 ===
The SNAP-8 reactors were designed, constructed and operated by Atomics International under contract with the National Aeronautics and Space Administration, with a target of delivering 600 kW of power for greater than 10,000 hr. Two SNAP-8 reactors were produced: The SNAP 8 Experimental Reactor and the SNAP 8 Developmental Reactor. Both SNAP 8 reactors used the same highly enriched uranium zirconium hydride fuel as the SNAP 2 and SNAP 10A reactors. The SNAP 8 design included primary and secondary NaK loops to transfer heat to the mercury rankine power conversion system. The electrical generating system for the SNAP 8 reactors was supplied by Aerojet General.

The SNAP 8 Experimental Reactor was a 600 kW reactor that was tested from 1963 to 1965. Early testing demonstrated SCRAM shutdown under planned and unplanned conditions, followed by 60 days delivering 450 kW. The reactor passed all the planned tests. At the end of the run, of the 211 fuel elements in the core, 44 were found to be intact and 167 had cracked cladding. These cracks allowed hydrogen and fission products to escape into the NaK coolant and for the coolant to react with the fuel.

The SNAP 8 Developmental Reactor had a reactor core measuring 9.5 by 33 inches (24 by 84 cm), contained a total of 18 pounds (8.2 kg) of fuel, had a power rating of 600 kW with 1300 °F outlet temperature, with a maximum 1 MW_{t} power out put at 1100 °F outlet temp. The reactor power testing began in January 1969 at the Santa Susana Field Laboratory. Because of the observed fuel element cracking in SNAP 8 Experimental Reactor, the Development Reactor was more closely monitored for radiation in the NaK coolant. Fission products (Xe-133, Xe-135 and Cs-137) appeared in the circulating coolant in May, demonstrating fuel cladding failure. The reactor was continued to be run until December, demonstrating 7,023 hours of 600 W output. Upon disassembly, 72 of the 211 fuel elements were judged to have cracked.

=== SNAP-10A ===
The SNAP-10A was a space-qualified nuclear reactor power system launched into space in 1965 under the SNAPSHOT program. It was built as a research project for the Air Force, to demonstrate the capability to generate higher power than RTGs. The reactor employed two moveable beryllium reflectors for control, and generated 35 kW_{t} at beginning of life. The system generated electricity by circulating NaK around lead tellurium thermocouples. To mitigate launch hazards, the reactor was not started until it reached a safe orbit.

SNAP-10A was launched into Earth orbit in April 1965, and used to power an Agena-D research satellite, built by Lockheed/Martin. The system produced 500W of electrical power during an abbreviated 43-day flight test. The reactor was prematurely shut down by a faulty command receiver. It is predicted to remain in orbit for 4,000 years. Although much of the fission products will have decayed in that time, the vast majority of uranium will remain, eventually returning to earth as fallout from burn up of the satellite.

== See also ==
- List of nuclear power systems in space
- Nuclear power in space

== General sources ==
- "Nuclear Power in Space". U.S. Department of Energy, Office of Nuclear Energy, Science & Technology
