= General-purpose heat source =

US DOE model of radioisotope thermoelectric generator

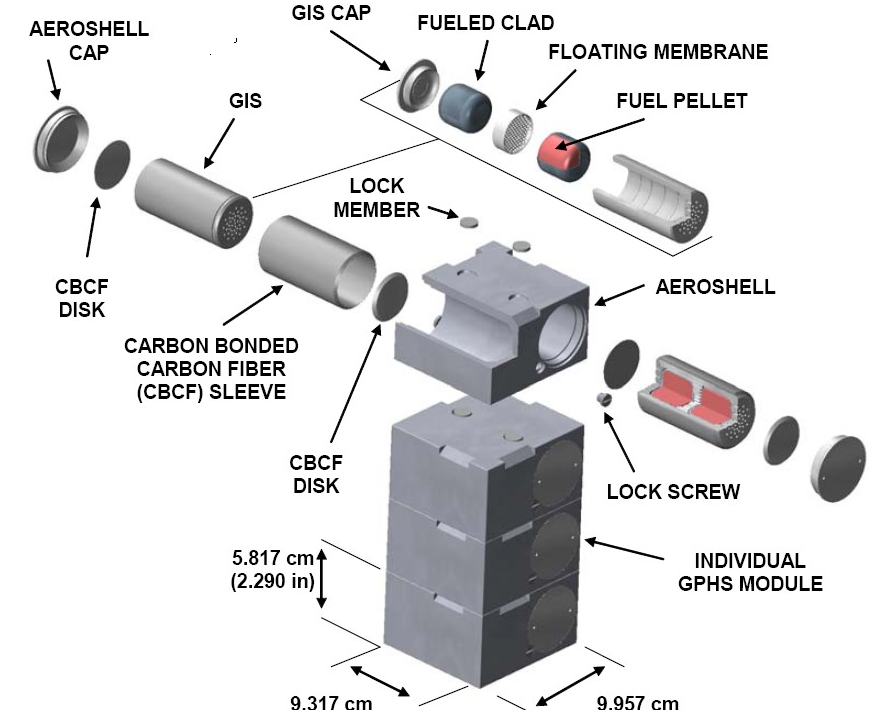
Exploded view of a stack of general-purpose heat source modules.

The general-purpose heat source is a U.S. DOE-designed radioactive heat source for radioisotope thermoelectric generators (RTG) or Stirling radioisotope generators (SRG). It is meant for space applications and is packaged as a stackable module.

== Characteristics ==
GPHSs are fueled with plutonium-238 dioxide. Each module has a temperature of over 600 degrees Celsius and delivers 250 watts at the time of manufacture. They measure 9.8 cm wide x 9.4 cm deep x 5.4 cm high and weigh no more than 1.44 kg each.

== Safety ==
GPHSs are designed with safety in mind and employ iridium-clad plutonium-238 dioxide pellets. The generated alpha particles are blocked by the cladding, thus no further radiation shielding is necessary. The pellets are encased within nested layers of carbon-based material and placed within an aeroshell housing to comprise the complete module.

The modules can withstand extreme conditions including a launch-pad explosion or a high-speed reentry. Overheating and impact tests were performed on several sample modules.

== Uses ==
GPHSs of this, or very similar, design were used in the GPHS-RTGs of Cassini-Huygens, New Horizons, Galileo and Ulysses. They are used in the multi-mission radioisotope thermoelectric generator, as used by Mars Science Laboratory (Curiosity rover). They are also used in the advanced Stirling radioisotope generator.

== Stages of assembly ==
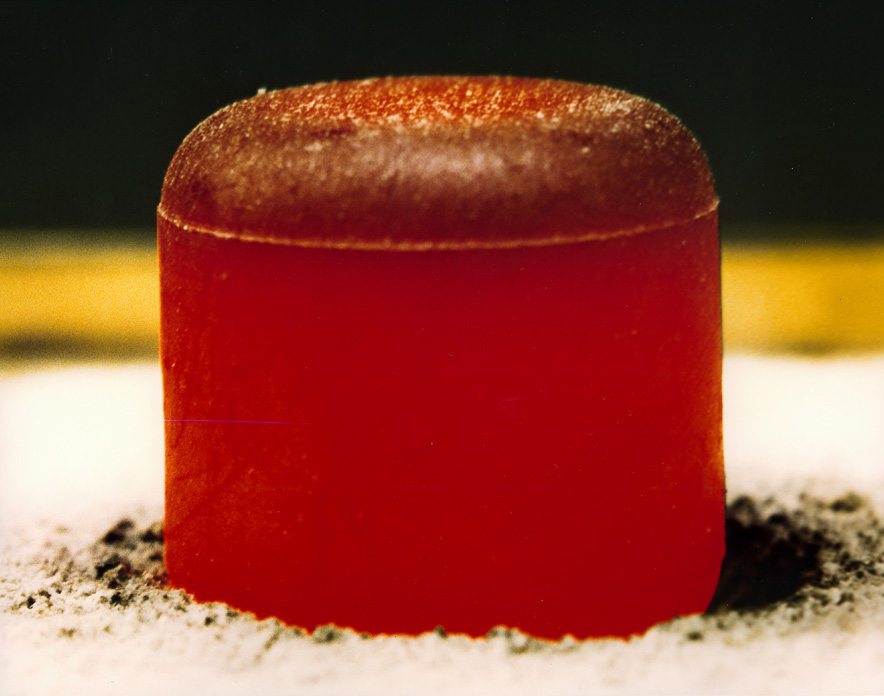
Plutonium pellet.

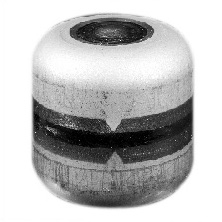
Plutonium pellet within iridium cladding.

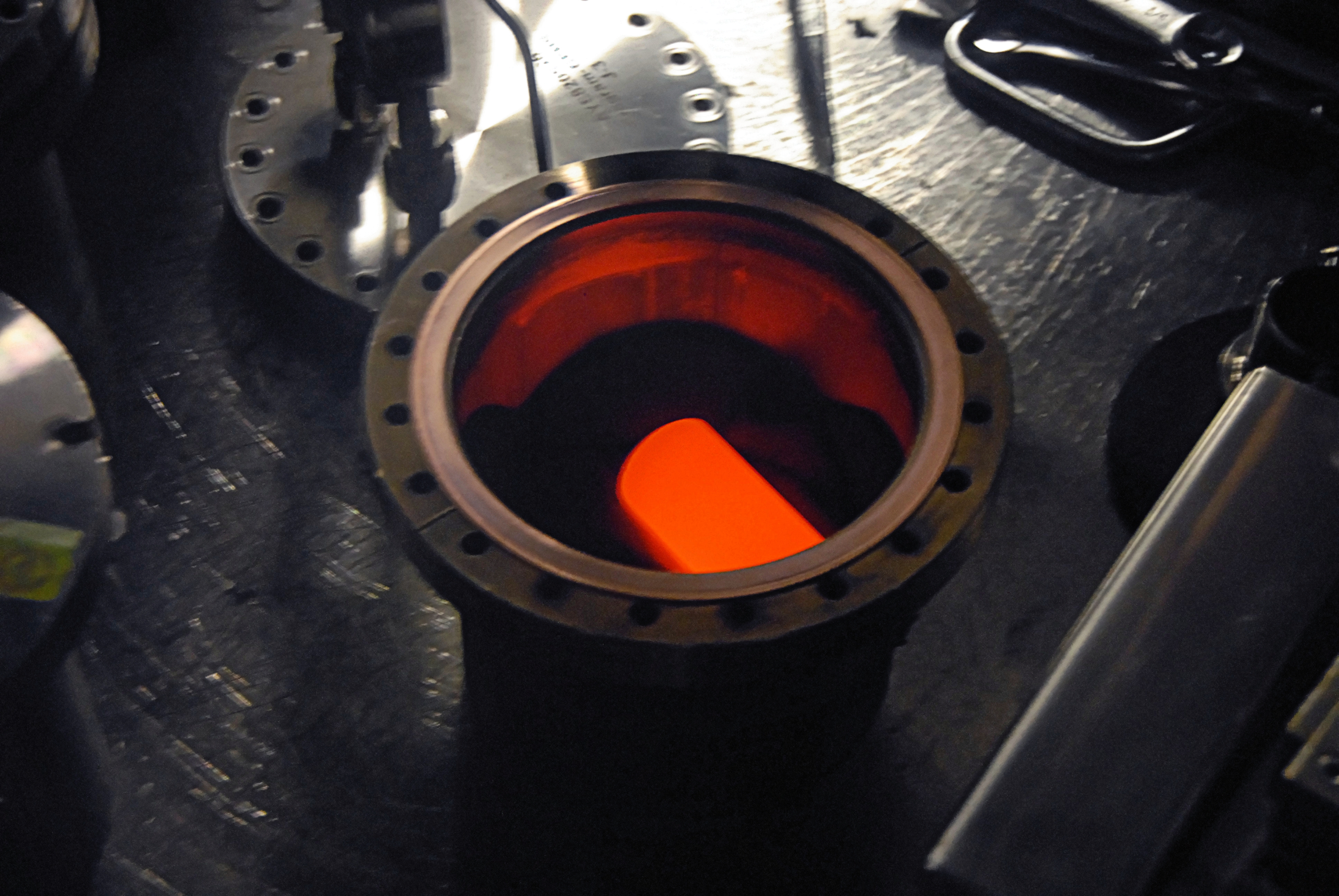
Assembled graphite impact shell.

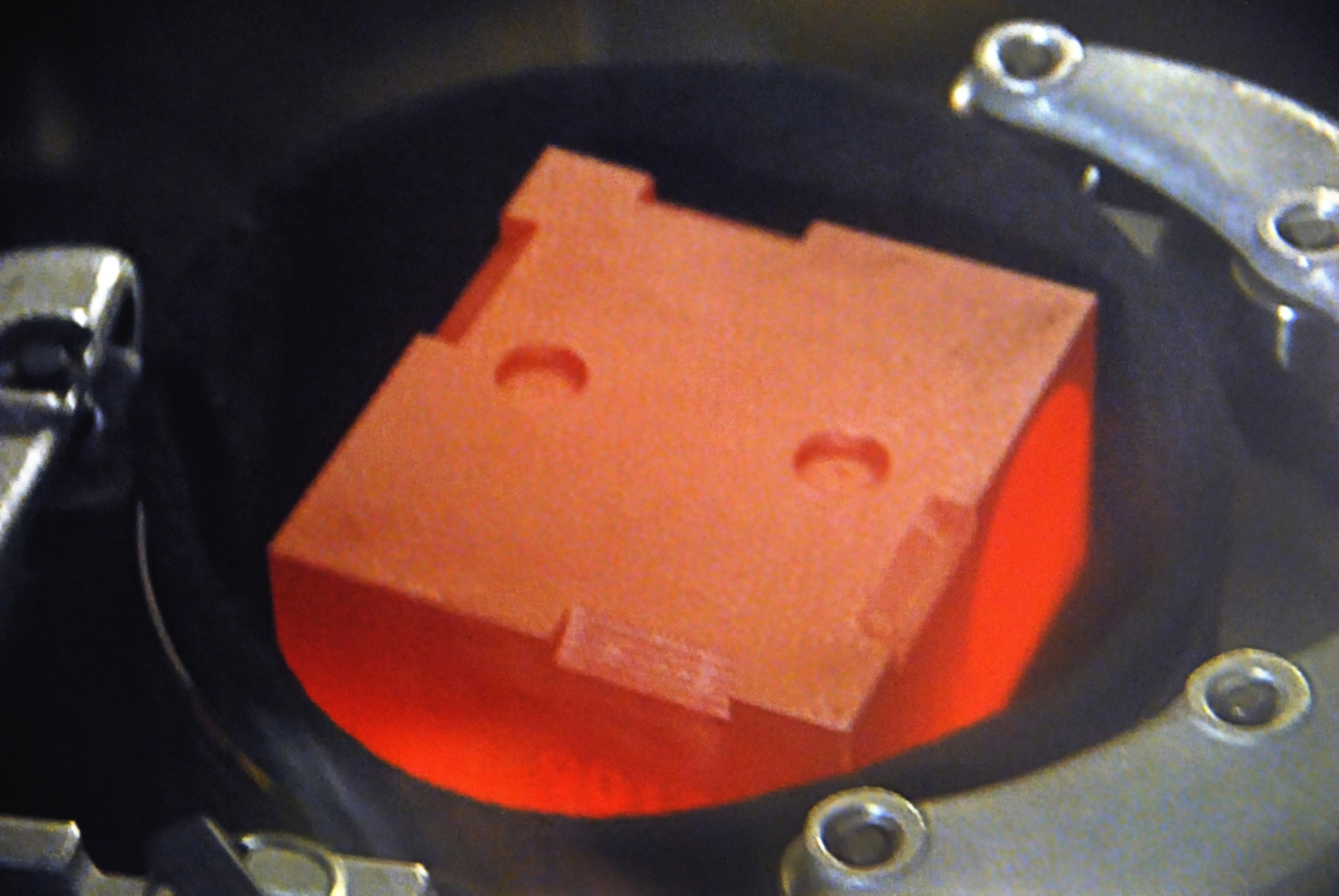
Assembled module.
