= SNAP-10A =

Experimental nuclear-powered US Air Force satellite

SNAP-10A (SNAPSHOT)
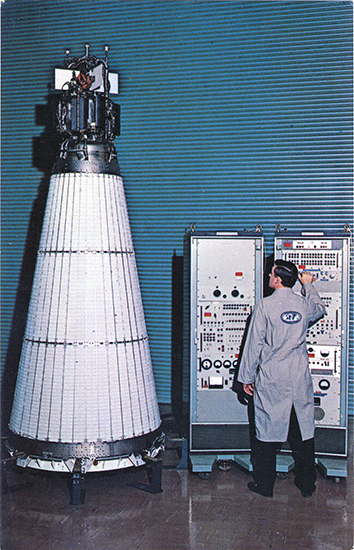
- Image of SNAP 10A Space Nuclear Power Plant
- Mission type: Engineering
- Operator: USAF
- COSPAR ID: 1965-027A
- SATCAT no.: 01314
- Mission duration: 43 days (achieved); 61 years, 7 months, 5 days (in orbit)

Spacecraft properties
- Manufacturer: Atomics International
- Launch mass: 440 kg (970 lb)

Start of mission
- Launch date: 3 April 1965, 21:25
- Rocket: Atlas-Agena D
- Launch site: Vandenberg AFB, PALC2-4

End of mission
- Last contact: 16 May 1965
- Decay date: c. 2965

Orbital parameters
- Reference system: Geocentric
- Regime: Low Earth
- Eccentricity: 0.00319
- Perigee altitude: 1,268 km (788 mi)
- Apogee altitude: 1,317 km (818 mi)
- Inclination: 90.2°
- Period: 111.4 minutes
- Epoch: 3 April 1965
- Systems for Nuclear Auxiliary Power

SNAP-10A (Systems for Nuclear Auxiliary Power, aka Snapshot for Space Nuclear Auxiliary Power Shot, also known as OPS 4682) was a US experimental nuclear powered satellite launched into space in 1965 as part of the SNAPSHOT program. The test marked both the world's first operation of a nuclear reactor in orbit, and the first operation of an ion thruster system in orbit. It is the only fission reactor power system launched into space by the United States. The reactor stopped working after just 43 days due to a non-nuclear electrical component failure. The Systems Nuclear Auxiliary Power Program reactor was specifically developed for satellite use in the 1950s and early 1960s under the supervision of the U.S. Atomic Energy Commission.

== History ==
The Systems for Nuclear Auxiliary Power (SNAP) program developed as a result of Project Feedback, a Rand Corporation study of reconnaissance satellites completed in 1954. As some of the proposed satellites had high power demands, some as high as a few kilowatts, the U.S. Atomic Energy Commission (AEC) requested a series of nuclear power-plant studies from industry in 1951. Completed in 1952, these studies determined that nuclear power plants were technically feasible for use on satellites.

In 1955, the AEC began two parallel SNAP nuclear power projects. One, contracted with The Martin Company, used radio-isotopic decay as the power source for its generators. These plants were given odd-numbered SNAP designations beginning with SNAP-1. The other project used nuclear reactors to generate energy, and was developed by the Atomics International Division of North American Aviation. Their systems were given even-numbered SNAP designations, the first being SNAP-2.

SNAP-10A was the first Atomics International, nuclear-reactor power system built for use in space. Evolved from the SNAP-10 300 watt design, SNAP-10A fulfilled a 1961 Department of Defense requirement for a 500 watt system.

Most of the systems development and reactor testing was conducted at the Santa Susana Field Laboratory, Ventura County, California using a number of specialized facilities.

== Construction ==
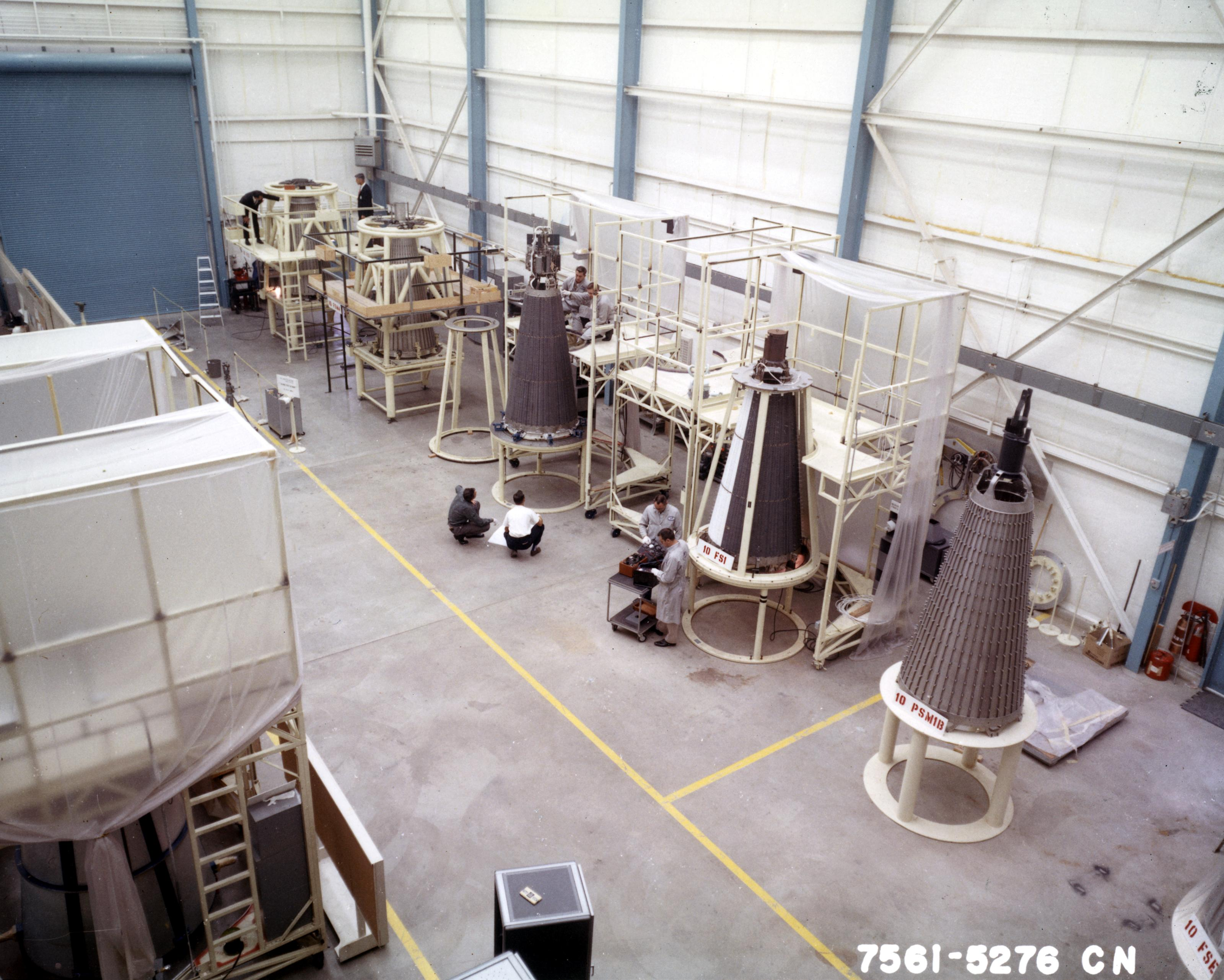
Production line of SNAP-10A reactors

The SNAP-10A has three major components – (1) a compact fission reactor that generates heat, (2) an energy converter that transforms some of the heat into electricity, and (3) a radiator that radiates away heat that cannot be used.

The reactor measures 39.62 cm (15.6 in) long, 22.4 cm (8.8 in) diameter and holds 37 fuel rods containing ^{235}U as uranium-zirconium-hydride fuel. The SNAP-10A reactor was designed for a thermal power output of 30 kW and unshielded weighs 650 lb (290 kg). The reactor can be identified at the top of the SNAP-10A unit.

Reflectors were arranged around the outside of the reactor to provide the means to control the reactor. The reflectors were composed of a layer of beryllium, which would reflect neutrons, thus allowing the reactor to begin and maintain the fission process. The reflectors were held in place by a retaining band anchored by an explosive bolt. When the reflector was ejected from the unit, the reactor could not sustain the nuclear fission reaction and the reactor permanently shut down.

The eutectic sodium-potassium (NaK) alloy was used as a coolant in the SNAP-10A. The NaK was circulated through the core and thermoelectric converters by a liquid metal direct current conduction-type pump. The thermoelectric converters (identified as the long white "apron") are doped silicon germanium materials, thermally coupled, but electrically isolated from the NaK heat transfer medium. The temperature difference between the NaK on one side of the thermoelectric converter and the cold of space on the other created an electric potential and usable electricity.

== SNAPSHOT mission ==
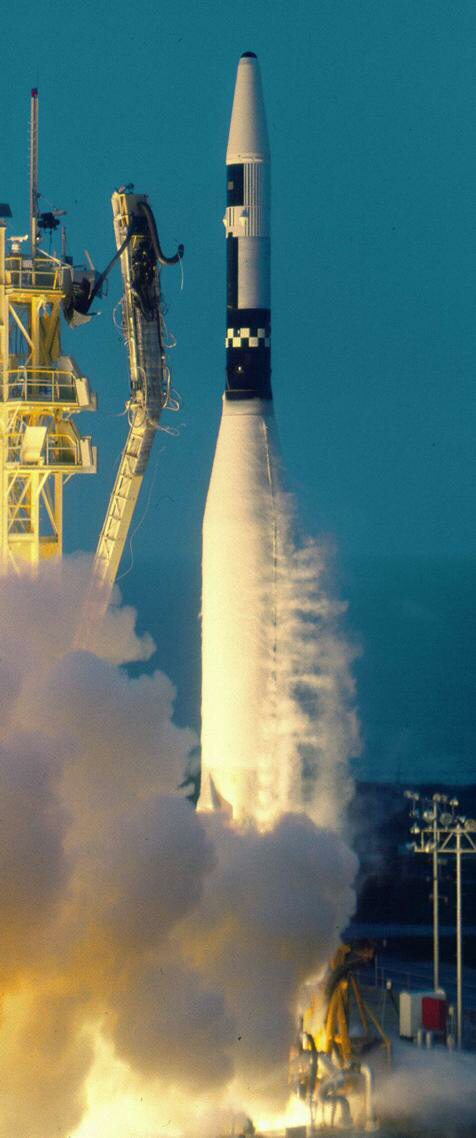
3 April 1965 launch of the SNAP-10A using an Atlas-Agena D SLV-3 launch vehicle. Launched from Vandenberg AFB, California.

=== Launch and orbital operation ===
SNAP-10A was launched from Vandenberg Air Force Base by an ATLAS Agena D rocket on 3 April 1965 into a low Earth orbit altitude of approx. 1,300 km. It is in a slightly retrograde polar orbit — this ensured that the spent rocket stages landed in the ocean. Its nuclear electrical source, made up of thermoelectric elements, was intended to produce over 500 watts of electrical power for one year. After 43 days, an onboard voltage regulator unrelated to the SNAP reactor failed within the spacecraft, causing the reactor core to be shut down, after reaching a maximum output of 590 watts.

After the 1965 system failure, the reactor was left in a 1,300-kilometre (700 nmi) Earth orbit for an expected duration of 1,000 years.

In November 1979 the vehicle began shedding, eventually losing 50 pieces of traceable debris. The reasons were unknown, but the cause could have been a collision. Although the main body remains in place, radioactive material may have been released. Later research, published in 2008 and based on Haystack data, suggests that there are another 60 or more pieces of debris of size <10 cm.

=== Ion propulsion ===
The SNAPSHOT test included a cesium ion thruster as a secondary payload, the first test of an electrically powered spacecraft propulsion system to operate in orbit (following the SERT-1 suborbital test in 1964). The ion-beam power supply was operated at 4500 V and 80 mA to produce a thrust of about 8.5 mN. The ion engine was to be operated off batteries for about one hour, and then the batteries were to be charged for approximately 15 hours using 0.1 kW of the nominal 0.5 kW SNAP system as the power supply. The ion engine operated for a period of less than 1 hour before being commanded off permanently. Analysis of flight data indicated a significant number of high-voltage breakdowns, and this apparently caused electromagnetic interference (EMI), causing attitude perturbations of the spacecraft. Ground tests indicated that the engine arcing produced conducted and radiated EMI significantly above design levels.

== Safety ==
The SNAP reactor program necessitated a safety program and led to the inception of the Aerospace Nuclear Safety Program. The program was established to evaluate the nuclear hazards associated with the construction, launch, operation and disposal of SNAP systems and to develop designs to assure their radiological safety.

Atomics International had primary responsibility for safety, while Sandia National Laboratories was responsible for the Aerospace Safety Independent Review and conducted many of the safety tests. Before launch was permitted, proof had to be obtained that under all circumstances the launch of the reactor would not pose a serious threat.

A variety of tests were successfully completed and several videos of the development and tests are available for viewing. The Idaho National Laboratory conducted three destructive tests of SNAP nuclear reactors at Test Area North prior to the launch of SNAP-10A. The SNAPTRAN-3 destructive experiment, on 1 April 1964, simulated a rocket crash into the ocean, purposely sending radioactive debris across the Idaho desert.

The testing and development involving radioactive materials caused environmental contamination at the former Atomics International Santa Susana Field Laboratory (SSFL) facilities. The United States Department of Energy is responsible for the identification and cleanup of the radioactive contamination. (The SSFL was also used for the unrelated testing and development of rocket engines by Rocketdyne primarily for NASA.) The DOE website supporting the site cleanup details the historical development of nuclear energy at SSFL including additional SNAP testing and development information.

== Related work and follow-on programs ==
Atomics International also developed and tested other compact nuclear reactors including the SNAP Experimental Reactor (SER), SNAP-2, SNAP-8 Developmental Reactor (SNAP8-DR) and SNAP-8 Experimental Reactor (SNAP-8ER) units at the Santa Susana Field Laboratory (see Systems for Nuclear Auxiliary Power article). Atomics International also built and operated the Sodium Reactor Experiment, the first U.S. nuclear power plant to supply electricity to a public power system.

As of 2010, more than 30 small fission power system nuclear reactors have been sent into space in Soviet RORSAT satellites; also, over 40 radioisotope thermoelectric generators have been used globally (principally US and USSR) on space missions.

== See also ==
- Kilopower
- Nuclear power in space
- RORSAT, the Soviet Union nuclear reactor powered satellites.
- Safe Affordable Fission Engine, NASA experimental series
