= Alkali-metal thermal to electric converter =

Electrochemical device to convert heat

An alkali-metal thermal-to-electric converter (AMTEC, originally called the sodium heat engine or SHE) is a thermally regenerative electrochemical device for the direct conversion of heat to electrical energy. It is characterized by high potential efficiencies and no moving parts except for the working fluid, which make it a candidate for space power applications.

It was invented by Joseph T. Kummer and Neill Weber at Ford in 1966, and is described in US Patents 3404036, 3458356, 3535163 and 4049877.

== Design ==
An Alkali-metal thermal to electric converter works by pumping an alkali metal - usually sodium - through, around, and over, a pipe loop. It is evaporated at one end by heat, putting it under pressure. It then passes through/over an anode, releasing electrons, thus, charge. It then passes through an electrolyte to conduct it to the other side. This works because the electrolyte chosen can conduct Ions, but not electrons so well. At a cathode, the Alkali metal gets its electrons back, effectively pumping electrons through the external circuit. The pressure from the electrolyte pushes it to a low-pressure vapor chamber, where it “cools off” to a liquid again. An electromagnetic pump, or a wick, takes this liquid sodium back to the hot side.

This device accepts a heat input in a range 900–1300 K and produces direct current with predicted device efficiencies of 15–40%. In the AMTEC, sodium is driven around a closed thermodynamic cycle between a high-temperature heat reservoir and a cooler reservoir at the heat rejection temperature. The unique feature of the AMTEC cycle is that sodium ion conduction between a high-pressure or -activity region and a low-pressure or -activity region on either side of a highly ionically conducting refractory solid electrolyte is thermodynamically nearly equivalent to an isothermal expansion of sodium vapor between the same high and low pressures. Electrochemical oxidation of neutral sodium at the anode leads to sodium ions, which traverse the solid electrolyte, and electrons, which travel from the anode through an external circuit, where they perform electrical work, to the low-pressure cathode, where they recombine with the ions to produce low-pressure sodium gas. The sodium gas generated at the cathode then travels to a condenser at the heat-rejection temperature of perhaps 400–700 K, where liquid sodium reforms. The AMTEC thus is an electrochemical concentration cell, which converts the work generated by expansion of sodium vapor directly into electric power.

The converter is based on the electrolyte used in the sodium–sulfur battery, sodium beta″-alumina, a crystalline phase of somewhat variable composition containing aluminum oxide, Al_{2}O_{3}, and sodium oxide, Na_{2}O, in a nominal ratio of 5:1, and a small amount of the oxide of a small-cation metal, usually lithium or magnesium, which stabilizes the beta″ crystal structure. The sodium beta″-alumina solid electrolyte (BASE) ceramic is nearly insulating with respect to transport of electrons and is a thermodynamically stable phase in contact with both liquid sodium and sodium at low pressure.

== Development ==
Single-cell AMTECs with open voltages as high as 1.55 V and maximum power density as high as 0.50 W/cm^{2} of solid electrolyte area at a temperature of 1173 K (900 °C) have been obtained with long-term stable refractory metal electrodes.

Efficiency of AMTEC cells has reached 16% in the laboratory. High-voltage multi-tube modules are predicted to have 20–25% efficiency, and power densities up to 0.2 kW/L appear to be achievable in the near future. Calculations show that replacing sodium with a potassium working fluid increases the peak efficiency from 28% to 31% at 1100 K with a 1 mm thick BASE tube.

Most work on AMTECs has concerned sodium working fluid devices. Potassium AMTECs have been run with potassium beta″-alumina solid electrolyte ceramics and show improved power at lower operating temperatures compared to sodium AMTECs.

A detailed quantitative model of the mass transport and interfacial kinetics behavior of AMTEC electrodes has been developed and used to fit and analyze the performance of a wide variety of electrodes, and to make predictions of the performance of optimized electrodes. The interfacial electrochemical kinetics can be further described quantitatively with a tunneling, diffusion, and desorption model. A reversible thermodynamic cycle for AMTEC shows that it is, at best, slightly less efficient than a Carnot cycle.

A related technology, the Johnson thermoelectric energy converter, uses a similar concept of pumping positive ions through an ion-selective membrane, using hydrogen rather than an alkali metal as the working fluid.

== Applications ==
AMTEC requires energy input at modest elevated temperatures and thus is easily adapted to any heat source, including radioisotope, concentrated solar power, external combustion, or a nuclear reactor. A solar thermal power conversion system based on an AMTEC could have advantages over other technologies for some applications including (thermal energy storage with phase-change material) and power conversion in a compact unit. The overall system could achieve as high as 14 W/kg with present collector technology and future AMTEC conversion efficiencies. The energy storage system has the potential to batteries, and the temperatures at which the system operates allows long life and reduced radiator size (heat-reject temperature of 600 K).

NASA investigated AMTEC conversion as a next-generation radioisotope power source for deep-space applications, but the technology was not selected for the next-generation systems.

While space power systems are of intrinsic interest, terrestrial applications could offer large-scale applications for AMTEC systems. At the 25% efficiency projected for the device and projected costs of 350 USD/kW, AMTEC could prove useful for a very wide variety of distributed generation applications including self-powered fans for high-efficiency furnaces and water heaters and recreational vehicle power supplies.
