= Radioisotope thermoelectric generator =

Electrical generator that uses heat from radioactive decay

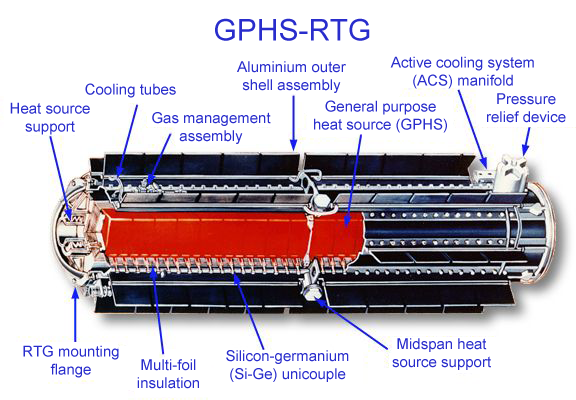
Diagram of an RTG used on the Cassini probe.

A radioisotope thermoelectric generator (RTG, RITEG), or radioisotope power system (RPS), is a type of nuclear battery that uses an array of thermocouples to convert the heat released by the decay of a suitable radioactive material into electricity by the Seebeck effect. This type of generator has no moving parts and is ideal for deployment in remote and harsh environments for extended periods with no risk of parts wearing out or malfunctioning.

RTGs are usually the most desirable power source for unmaintained situations that need a few hundred watts (or less) of power for durations too long for fuel cells, batteries, or generators to provide economically, and in places where solar cells are not practical. RTGs have been used as power sources in satellites, space probes, and uncrewed remote facilities such as a series of lighthouses built by the Soviet Union inside the Arctic Circle.

Safe use of RTGs requires containment of the radioisotopes long after the productive life of the unit. The expense of RTGs tends to limit their use to niche applications in rare or special situations.

== History ==
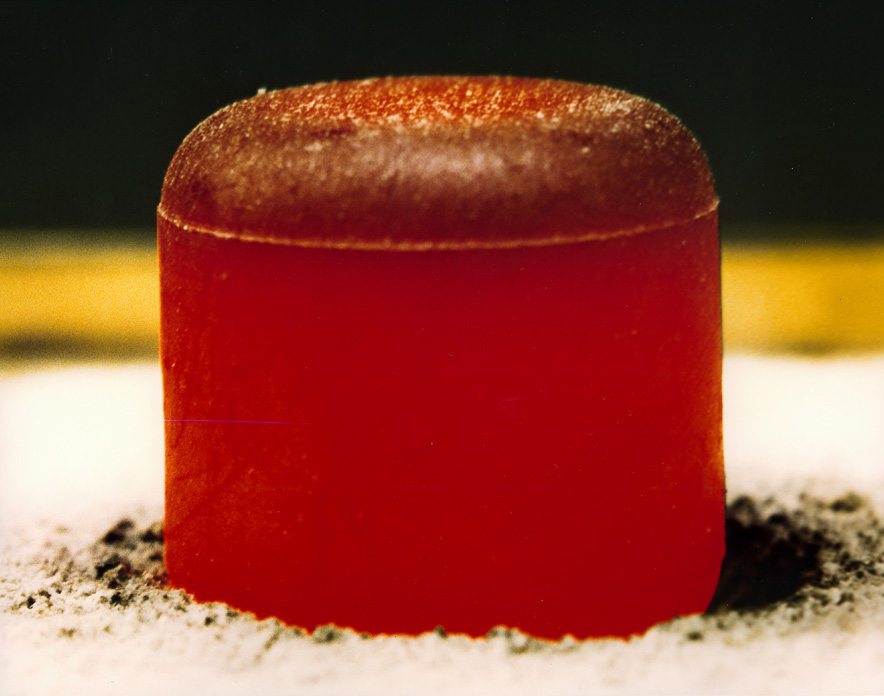
A pellet of ^{238}PuO_{2} as used in the RTG for the Cassini and Galileo missions. This photo was taken after insulating the pellet under a graphite blanket for several minutes and then removing the blanket. The pellet is glowing red hot due to the heat from radioactive decay (primarily α). The initial output is 62 watts.

The RTG was invented in 1954 by Mound Laboratories scientists Kenneth (Ken) C. Jordan (1921–2008) and John Birden (1918–2011). They were inducted into the National Inventors Hall of Fame in 2013. Jordan and Birden worked on an Army Signal Corps contract (R-65-8- 998 11-SC-03-91) beginning on 1 January 1957, to conduct research on radioactive materials and thermocouples suitable for the direct conversion of heat to electrical energy using polonium-210 as the heat source. RTGs were developed in the US during the late 1950s by Mound Laboratories in Miamisburg, Ohio, under contract with the United States Atomic Energy Commission. The project was led by Dr. Bertram C. Blanke.

The first RTG launched into space by the United States was SNAP 3B in 1961 powered by 96 grams of plutonium-238 metal, aboard the Navy Transit 4A spacecraft. One of the first terrestrial uses of RTGs was in 1966 by the US Navy at uninhabited Fairway Rock in Alaska. RTGs were used at that site until 1995.

A common RTG application is spacecraft power supply. Several generations of RTG design have been used for probes that traveled far from the Sun, rendering solar panels impractical. As such, they have been used for Pioneer 10 and 11; Voyager 1 and 2; Galileo; Ulysses; Cassini; New Horizons; and are planned for the Dragonfly mission to Titan. RTGs were also used instead of solar panels to power the two Viking landers, and for the scientific experiments left on the Moon by the crews of Apollo 12 through 17 (SNAP 27s). Because the Apollo 13 Moon landing was aborted, its RTG rests in the South Pacific Ocean, in the vicinity of the Tonga Trench. The Curiosity and Perseverance Mars rover designs selected RTGs to allow greater flexibility in landing sites and longer lifespan than the solar-powered option, as used in prior generations of rovers. RTGs were also used for the Nimbus, Transit and LES satellites. By comparison, only a few space vehicles have been launched using full-fledged nuclear reactors: the Soviet RORSAT series and the American SNAP-10A.

In addition to spacecraft, the Soviet Union built 1,007 RTGs to power uncrewed lighthouses and navigation beacons on the Soviet Arctic coast by the late 1980s. Many different types of RTGs (including Beta-M type) were built in the Soviet Union for a wide variety of purposes. The lighthouses were not maintained for many years after the dissolution of the Soviet Union in 1991. Some of the RTG units disappeared during this time—either by looting or by the natural forces of ice/storm/sea. In 1996, a project was begun by Russian and international supporters to decommission the RTGs in the lighthouses, and by 2021, all RTGs had been removed.

As of 1992, the United States Air Force also used RTGs to power remotely-located Arctic equipment, and the US government has used hundreds of such units to power remote stations globally. Sensing stations for Top-ROCC and SEEK IGLOO radar systems, predominantly located in Alaska, use RTGs. The units use strontium-90, and a larger number of such units have been deployed both on the ground and on the ocean floor than have been used on spacecraft, with public regulatory documents suggesting that the US had deployed at least 100–150 during the 1970s and 1980s.

In the past, small "plutonium cells" (very small ^{238}Pu-powered RTGs) were used in implanted heart pacemakers to ensure a very long "battery life". As of 2004, about ninety were still in use. By the end of 2007, the number was reported to be down to just nine. The Mound Laboratory Cardiac Pacemaker program began on 1 June 1966, in conjunction with NUMEC. The program was cancelled in 1972, when it was recognized that the heat source would not remain intact during cremation and there was no way to completely ensure that the units would not be cremated with their users' bodies.

== Design ==
The design of an RTG is simple by the standards of nuclear technology: the main component is a sturdy container of a radioactive material (the fuel). Thermocouples are placed in the walls of the container, with the outer end of each thermocouple connected to a heat sink. Radioactive decay of the fuel produces heat. It is the temperature difference between the fuel and the heat sink that allows the thermocouples to generate electricity.

A thermocouple is a thermoelectric device that can convert thermal energy directly into electrical energy using the Seebeck effect. It is made of two kinds of metal or semiconductor material. If they are connected to each other in a closed loop and the two junctions are at different temperatures, an electric current will flow in the loop. Typically a large number of thermocouples are connected in series to generate a higher voltage.

RTGs and fission reactors use very different nuclear reactions. Nuclear power reactors (including the miniaturized ones used in space) perform controlled nuclear fission in a chain reaction. The rate of the reaction can be controlled with neutron absorbing control rods, so power can be varied with demand or shut off (almost) entirely for maintenance. However, care is needed to avoid uncontrolled operation at dangerously high power levels, or even nuclear accident. Chain reactions do not occur in RTGs. Heat is produced through spontaneous radioactive decay at a non-adjustable and steadily decreasing rate that depends only on the amount of fuel isotope and its half-life. In an RTG, heat generation cannot be varied with demand or shut off when not needed and it is not possible to save more energy for later by reducing the power consumption. Therefore, auxiliary power supplies (such as rechargeable batteries) may be needed to meet peak demand, and adequate cooling must be provided at all times including the pre-launch and early flight phases of a space mission. While spectacular failures like a nuclear meltdown or explosion are impossible with an RTG, there is still a risk of radioactive contamination if the rocket explodes or the device reenters the atmosphere and disintegrates. For terrestrial RTGs, damage by storms, seasonal ice, or vandalism are potential risks.

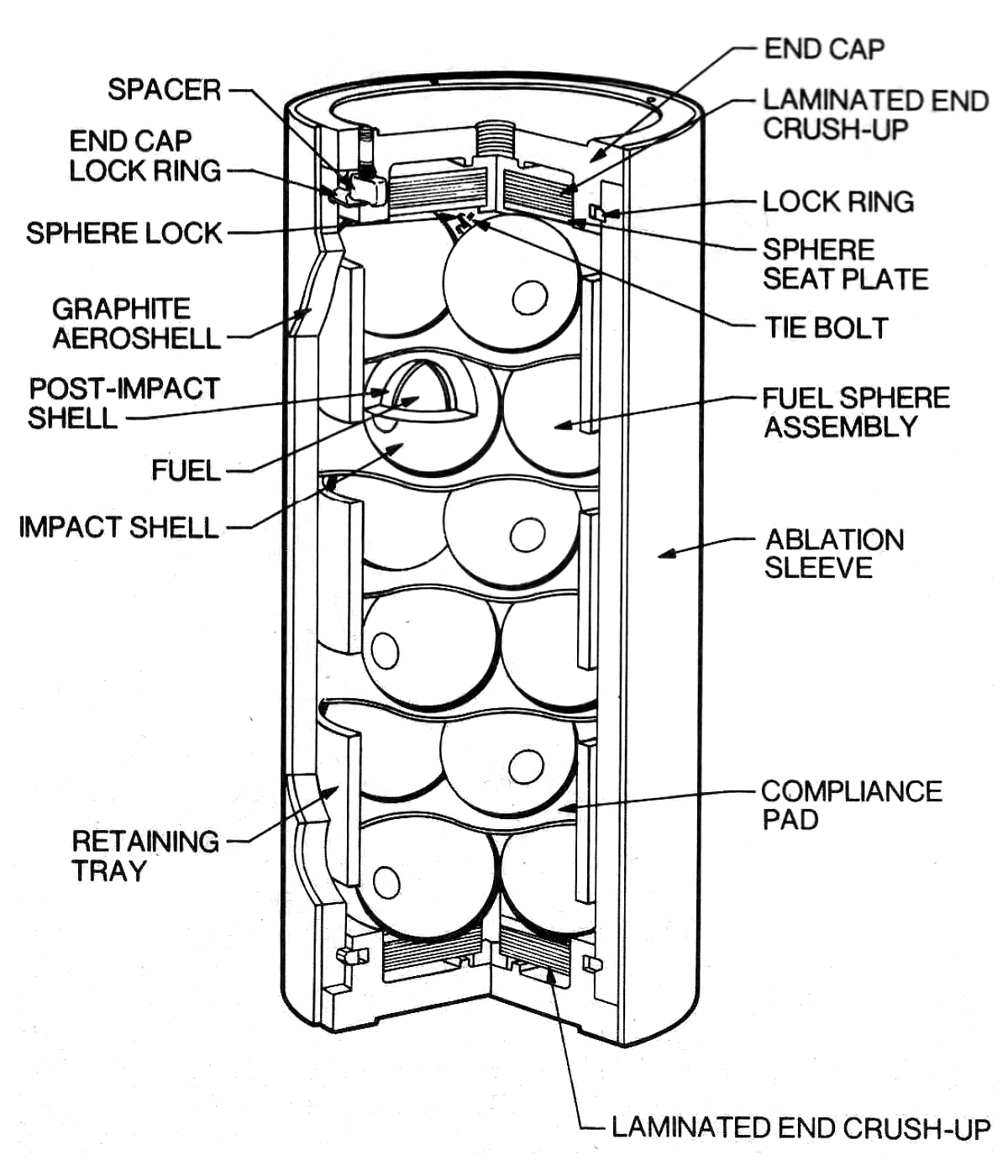
Diagram of RTG fuel container, showing the plutonium-238 oxide spheres

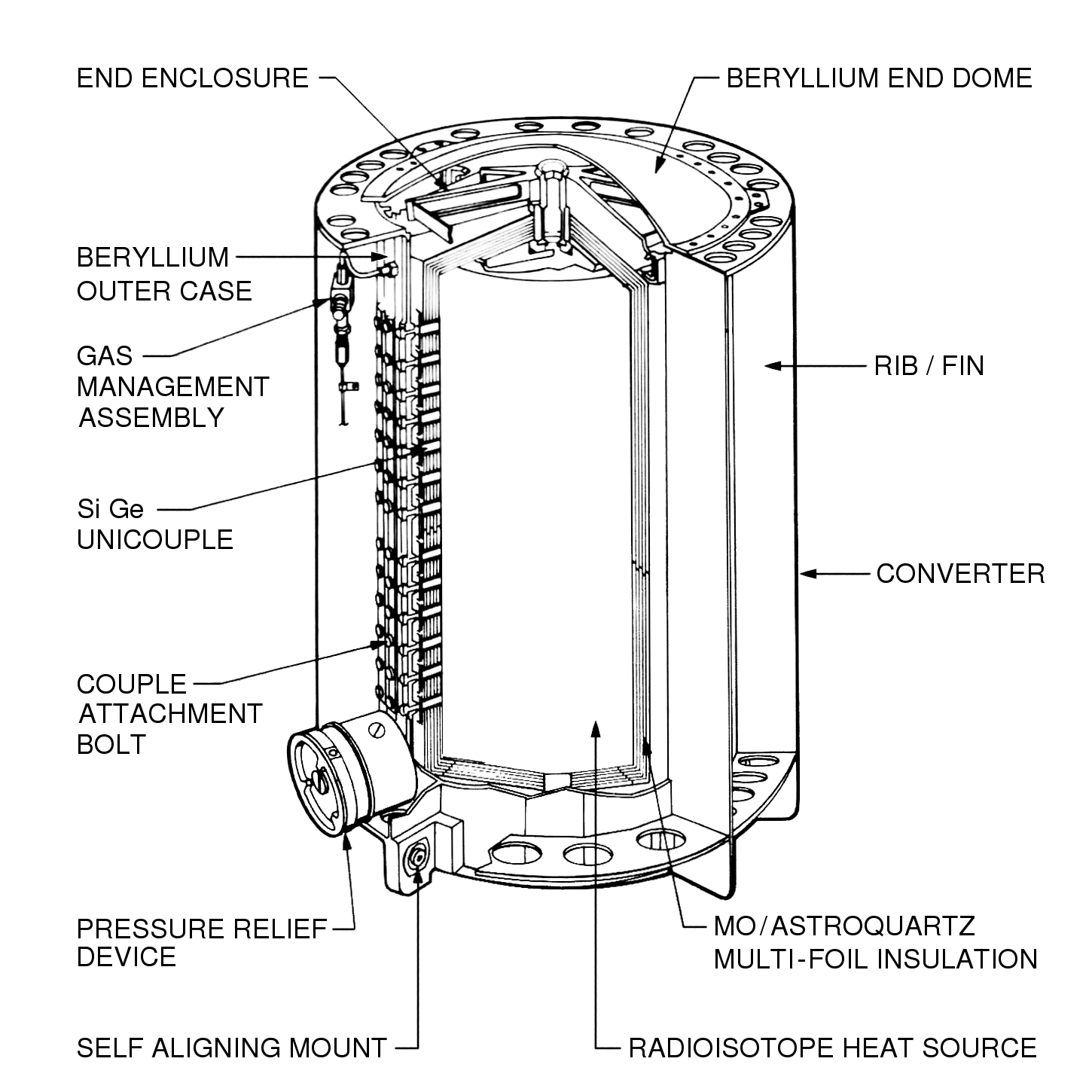
Diagram of RTG shell, showing the power-producing silicon-germanium thermocouples

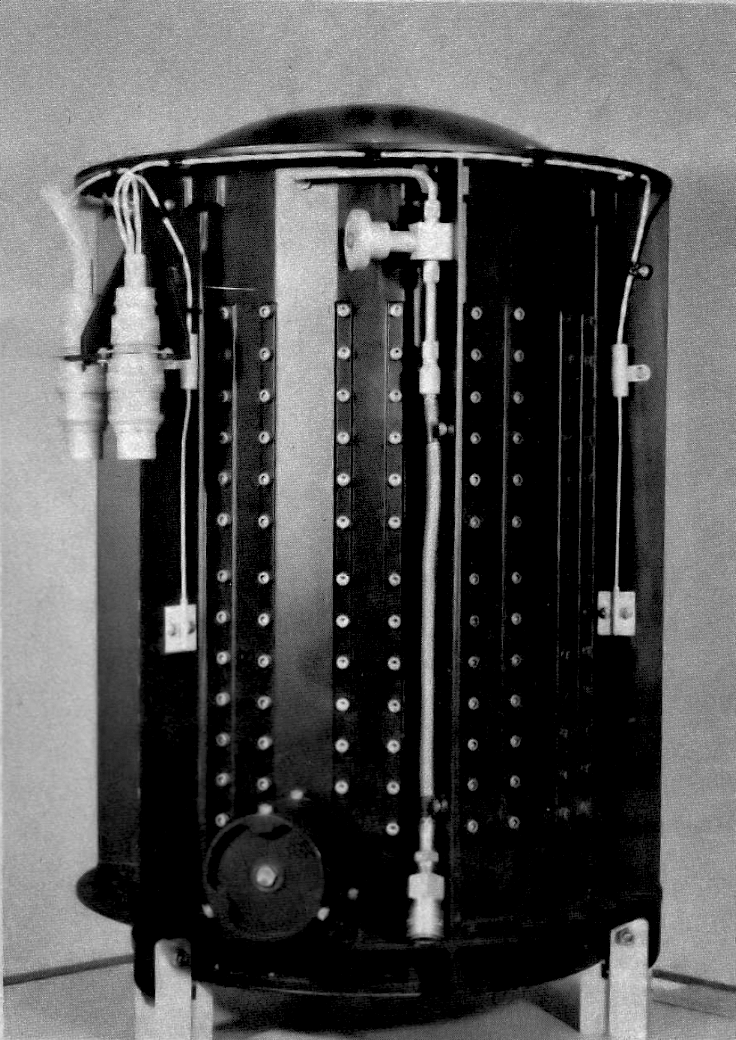
Model of an RTG unit

== Developments ==
Due to the shortage of plutonium-238, a new kind of RTG assisted by subcritical reactions has been proposed. In this kind of RTG, the alpha decay from the radioisotope is also used in alpha-neutron reactions with a suitable element such as beryllium. This way a long-lived neutron source is produced. Because the system has a criticality close to but less than 1, i.e. K_{eff} < 1, a subcritical multiplication is achieved which increases the neutron background and produces energy from fission reactions. Though the number of fissions produced in the RTG is very small (making their gamma radiation negligible), because each fission releases over 30 times more energy than each alpha decay (200 MeV compared to 6 MeV), up to a 10% energy gain is attainable, which translates into a reduction of the ^{238}Pu needed per mission. The idea was proposed to NASA in 2012 for the yearly NASA NSPIRE competition, which translated to Idaho National Laboratory at the Center for Space Nuclear Research (CSNR) in 2013 for studies of feasibility. However the essentials are unmodified.

RTG have been proposed for use on realistic interstellar precursor missions and interstellar probes. An example of this is the Innovative Interstellar Explorer (2003–current) proposal from NASA. An RTG using ^{241}Am was proposed for this type of mission in 2002. This could support mission extensions up to 1000 years on the interstellar probe, because ^{241}Am decays more slowly than ^{238}Pu. Other isotopes for RTG were also examined in the study, looking at traits such as watt/gram, half-life, and decay products. An interstellar probe proposal from 1999 suggested using three advanced radioisotope power sources (ARPS). The RTG electricity can be used for powering scientific instruments and communication to Earth on the probes. One mission proposed using the electricity to power ion engines, calling this method radioisotope electric propulsion (REP).

A power enhancement for radioisotope heat sources based on a self-induced electrostatic field has been proposed. According to the authors, enhancements of 5-10% could be attainable using beta sources.

== Models ==
A typical RTG is powered by radioactive decay and features electricity from thermoelectric conversion, but for the sake of knowledge, some systems with some variations on that concept are included here.

=== Space ===
Known spacecraft/nuclear power systems and their fate. Systems face a variety of fates, for example, Apollo's SNAP-27 were left on the Moon. Some other spacecraft also have small radioisotope heaters, for example each of the Mars Exploration Rovers have a 1 watt radioisotope heater. Spacecraft use different amounts of material, for example MSL Curiosity has 4.8 kg of plutonium-238 dioxide.

| Name and model | Used on (# of RTGs per user) | Maximum output | | Radio- isotope | Max fuel used (kg) | Mass (kg) | Power/total mass (W/kg) | Power/fuel mass (W/kg) |
| Name and model | Used on (# of RTGs per user) | Electrical (W) | Heat (W) | Radio- isotope | Max fuel used (kg) | Mass (kg) | Power/total mass (W/kg) | Power/fuel mass (W/kg) |
|---|---|---|---|---|---|---|---|---|
| MMRTG | MSL/Curiosity rover, Perseverance/Mars 2020 rover and Dragonfly (Not launched) | c. 110 | c. 2,000 | ^{238}Pu | c. 4 | <45 | 2.4 | c. 30 |
| GPHS-RTG | Cassini (3), New Horizons (1), Galileo (2), Ulysses (1) | 300 | 4,400 | ^{238}Pu | 7.8 | 55.9–57.8 | 5.2–5.4 | 38 |
| MHW-RTG | LES-8/9, Voyager 1 (3), Voyager 2 (3) | 160 | 2,400 | ^{238}Pu | c. 4.5 | 37.7 | 4.2 | c. 36 |
| SNAP-3B | Transit-4A (1) | 2.7 | 52.5 | ^{238}Pu | ? | 2.1 | 1.3 | ? |
| SNAP-9A | Transit 5BN1/2 (1) | 25 | 525 | ^{238}Pu | c. 1 | 12.3 | 2.0 | c. 30 |
| SNAP-19 | Nimbus-3 (2), Pioneer 10 (4), Pioneer 11 (4) | 40.3 | 525 | ^{238}Pu | c. 1 | 13.6 | 2.9 | c. 40 |
| modified SNAP-19 | Viking 1 (2), Viking 2 (2) | 42.7 | 525 | ^{238}Pu | c. 1 | 15.2 | 2.8 | c. 40 |
| SNAP-27 | Apollo 12–17 ALSEP (1) | 73 | 1,480 | ^{238}Pu | 3.8 | 20 | 3.65 | 19 |
| (fission reactor) Buk (BES-5)** | US-As (1) | 3,000 | 100,000 | highly enriched ^{235}U | 30 | 1,000 | 3.0 | 100 |
| (fission reactor) SNAP-10A*** | SNAP-10A (1) | 600 | 30,000 | highly enriched ^{235}U | | 431 | 1.4 | ? |
| ASRG**** | prototype design (not launched), Discovery Program | c. 140 (2x70) | c. 500 | ^{238}Pu | 1 | 34 | 4.1 | c. 100 |

** not really an RTG, the BES-5 Buk (БЭС-5) reactor was a fast reactor which used thermocouples based on semiconductors to convert heat directly into electricity

*** not really an RTG, the SNAP-10A used enriched uranium fuel, zirconium hydride as a moderator, liquid sodium potassium alloy coolant, and was activated or deactivated with beryllium reflectors Reactor heat fed a thermoelectric conversion system for electrical production.

**** not really an RTG, the ASRG uses a Stirling power device that runs on radioisotope (see Stirling radioisotope generator)

=== Terrestrial ===
| Name and model | Use | Maximum output | | Radioisotope | Max fuel used (kg) | Mass (kg) |
| Name and model | Use | Electrical (W) | Heat (W) | Radioisotope | Max fuel used (kg) | Mass (kg) |
|---|---|---|---|---|---|---|
| Beta-M | Obsolete Soviet uncrewed lighthouses and beacons | 10 | 230 | ^{90}SrTiO_{3} | 0.26 | 560 |
| Efir-MA | Obsolete Soviet uncrewed lighthouses and beacons | 30 | 720 | ? | ? | 1,250 |
| IEU-1 | Obsolete Soviet uncrewed lighthouses and beacons | 80 | 2,200 | ^{90}Sr | ? | 2,500 |
| IEU-2 | Obsolete Soviet uncrewed lighthouses and beacons | 14 | 580 | ? | ? | 600 |
| Gong | Obsolete Soviet uncrewed lighthouses and beacons | 18 | 315 | ? | ? | 600 |
| Gorn | Obsolete Soviet uncrewed lighthouses and beacons | 60 | 1,100 | ? | ? | 1,050 |
| IEU-2M | Obsolete Soviet uncrewed lighthouses and beacons | 20 | 690 | ? | ? | 600 |
| IEU-1M | Obsolete Soviet uncrewed lighthouses and beacons | 120 (180) | 2,200 (3,300) | ^{90}Sr | ? | 2(3) × 1,050 |
| Sentinel 25 | Remote U.S. arctic monitoring sites | 9–20 | | SrTiO_{3} | 0.54 | 907–1,814 |
| Sentinel 100F | Remote U.S. arctic monitoring sites | 53 | | Sr_{2}TiO_{4} | 1.77 | 1,234 |
| RIPPLE X | Buoys, Lighthouses | 33 | | SrTiO_{3} | | 1,500 |
| Milliwatt RTG | Permissive Action Link power source | 4–4.5 | | ^{238}Pu | ? | ? |

== Fuels ==
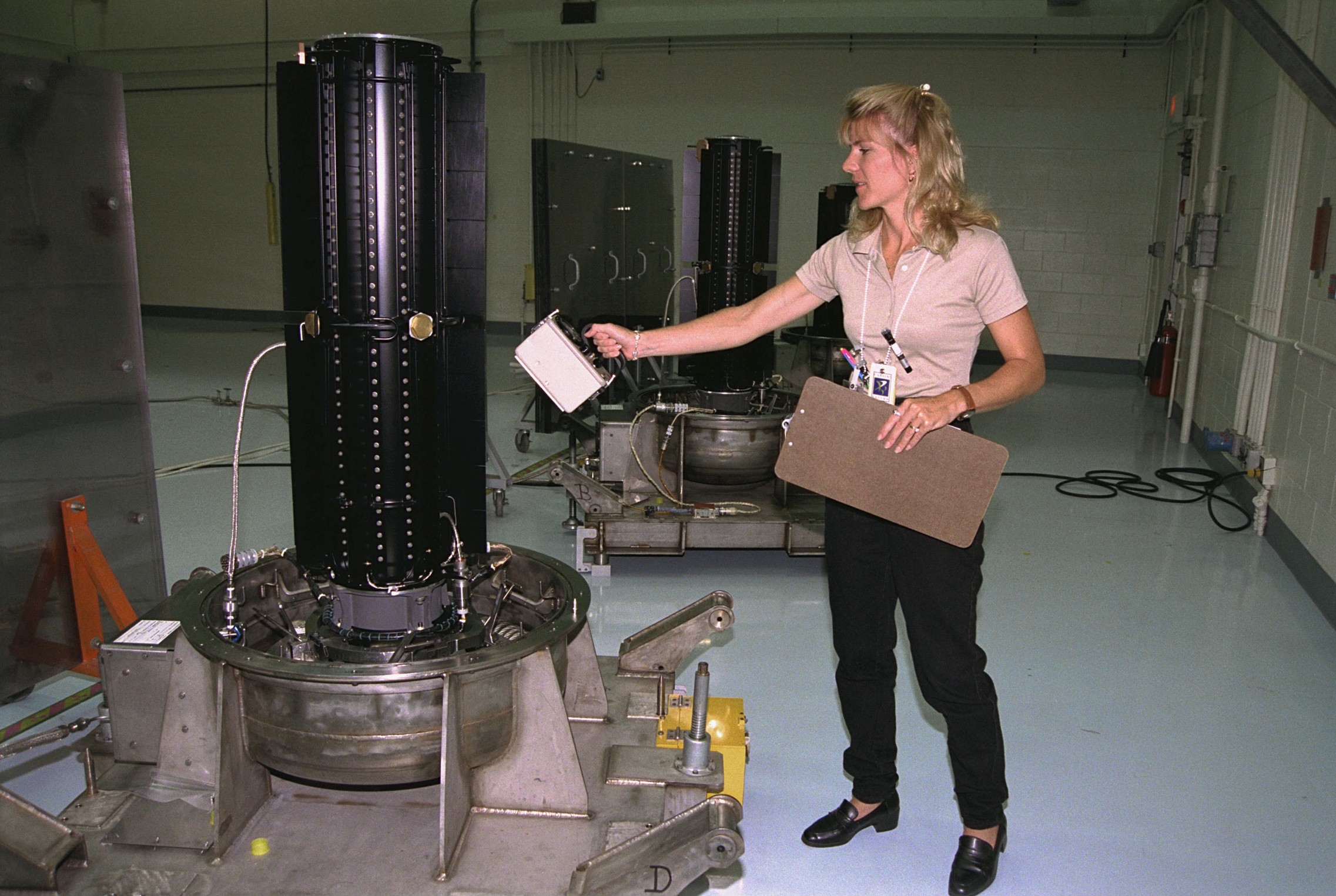
Inspection of Cassini-Huygens RTGs before launch

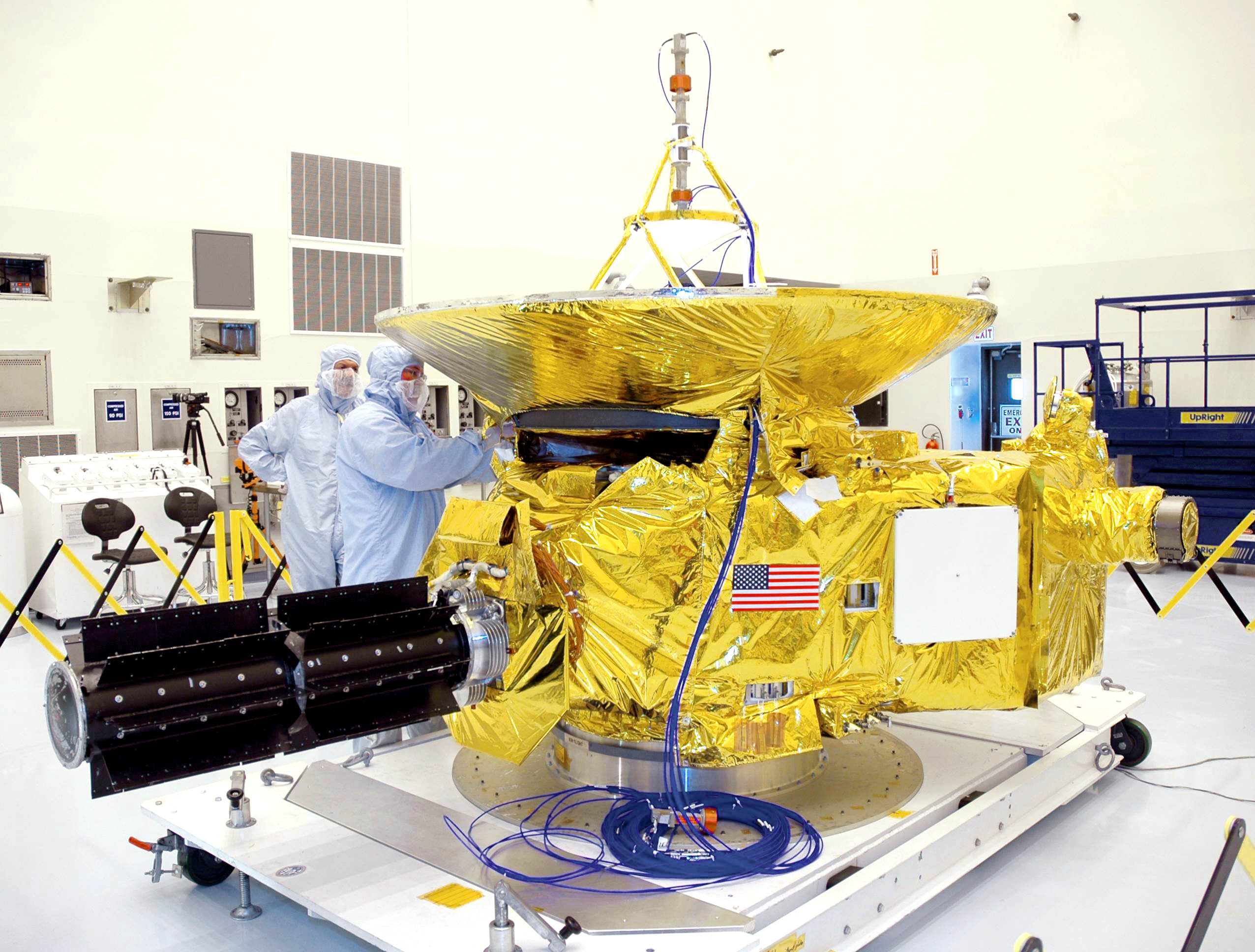
New Horizons in assembly hall

The radioactive material used in RTGs must have several characteristics:

1. Its half-life must be long enough so that it will release energy at a relatively constant rate for a reasonable amount of time. The amount of energy released per time (power) of a given quantity is inversely proportional to half-life. An isotope with twice the half-life and the same energy per decay will release power at half the rate per mole. Typical half-lives for radioisotopes used in RTGs are therefore several decades, although isotopes with shorter half-lives could be used for specialized applications.
2. For spaceflight use, the fuel must produce a large amount of power per mass and volume (density). Density and weight are not as important for terrestrial use, unless there are size restrictions. The decay energy can be calculated if the energy of radioactive radiation or the mass loss before and after radioactive decay is known. Energy release per decay is proportional to power production per mole.
3. Radiation must be of a type easily absorbed and transformed into thermal radiation, preferably alpha radiation. Beta radiation can emit considerable gamma/X-ray radiation through bremsstrahlung secondary radiation production and therefore requires heavy shielding. Isotopes must not produce significant amounts of gamma, neutron radiation or penetrating radiation in general through other decay modes or decay chain products.

The first two criteria limit the number of possible fuels to fewer than thirty nuclides within the entire table of nuclides.

Plutonium-238, curium-244, strontium-90, and most recently americium-241 are the most often cited candidate isotopes, but 43 more isotopes out of approximately 1,300 were considered at the beginning in the 1950s.

The table below does not necessarily give power densities for the pure material but for a chemically inert form. For actinides this is of little concern as their oxides are usually inert enough (and can be transformed into ceramics further increasing their stability), but for alkali metals and alkaline earth metals like caesium or strontium respectively, relatively complex (and heavy) chemical compounds have to be used. For example, strontium is commonly used as strontium titanate in RTGs, which increases molar mass by about a factor of 2. Furthermore, depending on the source, isotopic purity may not be obtainable. Plutonium extracted from spent nuclear fuel has a low share of Pu-238, so plutonium-238 for use in RTGs is usually purpose-made by neutron irradiation of neptunium-237, further raising costs. Caesium in fission products is almost equal parts Cs-135 and Cs-137, plus significant amounts of stable Cs-133 and, in "young" spent fuel, short lived Cs-134. If isotope separation, a costly and time-consuming process, is to be avoided, this has to be factored in, too. While historically RTGs have been rather small, there is in theory nothing preventing RTGs from reaching into the megawatt_{thermal} range of power. However, for such applications actinides are less suitable than lighter radioisotopes as the critical mass is orders of magnitude below the mass needed to produce such amounts of power. As Sr-90, Cs-137 and other lighter radionuclides cannot maintain a nuclear chain reaction under any circumstances, RTGs of arbitrary size and power could be assembled from them if enough material can be produced. In general, however, potential applications for such large-scale RTGs are more the domain of small modular reactors, microreactors or non-nuclear power sources.

| Material | Shielding requirement | Power density (Watts/Gram) | Half-life (years) | Refs |
|---|---|---|---|---|
| ^{238}Pu | Low | 0.57 | 87.7 | |
| ^{90}Sr | High | 0.95 | 28.8 | |
| ^{210}Po | Low | 140 | 0.378 | |
| ^{241}Am | Medium | 0.114 | 432 | |

=== ^{238}Pu ===
Plutonium-238 has a half-life of 87.7 years, reasonable power density of 0.57 watts per gram, and exceptionally low gamma and neutron radiation levels. ^{238}Pu has the lowest shielding requirements. Only three candidate isotopes meet the last criterion (not all are listed above) and need less than 25 mm of lead shielding to block the radiation. ^{238}Pu (the best of these three) needs less than 2.5 mm, and in many cases, no shielding is needed in a ^{238}Pu RTG, as the casing itself is adequate. ^{238}Pu has become the most widely used fuel for RTGs, in the form of plutonium(IV) oxide (PuO_{2}).

However, plutonium(IV) oxide containing a natural abundance of oxygen emits neutrons at the rate of roughly 2.3×10^{4} n/sec/g of ^{238}Pu. This emission rate is relatively high compared to the neutron emission rate of plutonium-238 metal. The metal containing no light element impurities emits roughly 2.8×10^{3} n/sec/g of ^{238}Pu. These neutrons are produced by the spontaneous fission of ^{238}Pu.

The difference in the emission rates of the metal and the oxide is due mainly to the alpha, neutron reaction with the oxygen-18 and oxygen-17 in the oxide. The normal amount of oxygen-18 present in the natural form is 0.204% while that of oxygen-17 is 0.037%. The reduction of the oxygen-17 and oxygen-18 present in the plutonium dioxide will result in a much lower neutron emission rate for the oxide; this can be accomplished by a gas phase ^{16}O_{2} exchange method. Regular production batches of ^{238}PuO_{2} particles precipitated as a hydroxide were used to show that large production batches could be effectively ^{16}O_{2}-exchanged on a routine basis. High-fired ^{238}PuO_{2} microspheres were successfully ^{16}O_{2}-exchanged showing that an exchange will take place regardless of the previous heat treatment history of the ^{238}PuO_{2}. This lowering of the neutron emission rate of PuO_{2} containing normal oxygen by a factor of five was discovered during the cardiac pacemaker research at Mound Laboratory in 1966, due in part to the Mound Laboratory's experience with production of stable isotopes beginning in 1960. For production of the large heat sources the shielding required would have been prohibitive without this process.

Unlike the other three isotopes discussed in this section, ^{238}Pu must be specifically synthesized and is not abundant as a nuclear waste product. At present only Russia has maintained high-volume production, while in the US, no more than 50 g (1.8 oz) were produced in total between 2013 and 2018. The US agencies involved desire to begin the production of the material at a rate of 300 to 400 grams (11 to 14 oz) per year. If this plan is funded, the goal would be to set up automation and scale-up processes in order to produce an average of 1.5 kg (3.3 lb) per year by 2025.

=== ^{90}Sr ===
Strontium-90 has been used by the Soviet Union in terrestrial RTGs. ^{90}Sr decays by β^{−} decay into ^{90}Y, which quickly β-decays again. It has a lower decay energy than ^{238}Pu, but its shorter half-life of 28.8 years and lower atomic weight yield a power density for pure metal of 0.95 watts per gram. As ^{90}Sr is a very reactive alkaline earth metal and a bone seeker that accumulates in bone-tissue due to its chemical similarity to calcium (once in the bones it can significantly damage the bone marrow, a rapidly dividing tissue), it is usually not used in pure form in RTGs. The most common form is the perovskite strontium titanate (SrTiO_{3}) which is chemically nigh-inert and has a high melting point. While its Mohs hardness of 5.5 has made it ill-suited as a diamond simulant, it is of sufficient hardness to withstand some forms of accidental release from its shielding without too fine dispersal of dust. The downside to using SrTiO_{3} instead of the native metal is it reduces power density, as the TiO_{3} part of the material does not produce any decay heat. ^{90}Sr has a high fission product yield in the fission of both ^{235}U and ^{239}Pu and is thus available in large quantities at a relatively low price if extracted from spent nuclear fuel. Starting from the oxide or the native metal, one pathway to obtaining SrTiO_{3} is to let it transform to strontium hydroxide in aqueous solution, which absorbs carbon dioxide from air to become less soluble strontium carbonate. Reaction of strontium carbonate with titanium dioxide at high temperature produces the desired strontium titanate plus carbon dioxide. If desired, the strontium titanate product can then be formed into a ceramic-like aggregate via sintering.

=== ^{210}Po ===
Some prototype RTGs, first built in 1958 by the US Atomic Energy Commission, have used polonium-210. This isotope provides phenomenal power density (pure ^{210}Po emits 140 W/g) because of its high decay rate, but has limited use because of its very short half-life of 138 days. A half-gram sample of ^{210}Po reaches temperatures of over 500 °C (900 °F). As ^{210}Po is a pure alpha-emitter and does not emit significant gamma or X-ray radiation, the shielding requirements are as low as those for ^{238}Pu. While the short half-life also reduces the time during which accidental release to the environment is a concern, polonium-210 is extremely radiotoxic if ingested and can cause significant harm even in chemically inert forms, which pass through the digestive tract as a "foreign object". A common route of production (whether accidental or deliberate) is neutron irradiation of ^{209}Bi, the only naturally occurring isotope of bismuth. It is this accidental production that is cited as an argument against the use of lead-bismuth eutectic as a coolant in liquid metal reactors. However, if a sufficient demand for polonium-210 exists, its extraction could be worthwhile similar to how tritium is economically recovered from the heavy water moderator in CANDUs.

=== ^{241}Am ===
Americium-241 is a candidate isotope with much greater availability than ^{238}Pu. Though ^{241}Am has a half-life of 432 years, which is about five times longer than that of ^{238}Pu and could hypothetically power a device for centuries, missions with more than 10 years were not the subject of the research until 2019. The power density of ^{241}Am is only one-fourth that of ^{238}Pu, and ^{241}Am produces more penetrating radiation through decay chain products than ^{238}Pu and needs more shielding. Its shielding requirements in a RTG are the third lowest: only ^{238}Pu and ^{210}Po require less. With a current global shortage of ^{238}Pu, ^{241}Am is being studied as RTG fuel by ESA and in 2019, UK's National Nuclear Laboratory announced the generation of usable electricity. An advantage over ^{238}Pu is that it is produced as nuclear waste and is nearly isotopically pure. Prototype designs of ^{241}Am RTGs expect 2–2.2 W_{e}/kg for 5–50 W_{e} RTGs design but in practical testing dropped to 1.3–1.9 W_{e}/kg. Americium-241 is currently used in small quantities in household smoke detectors and thus its handling and properties are well-established. However, it decays to neptunium-237, the most chemically mobile among the actinides.

== Life span ==
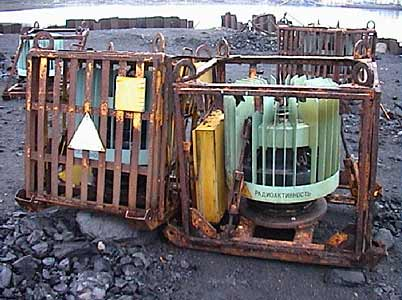
^{90}Sr-powered Soviet RTGs in dilapidated condition.

Most RTGs use ^{238}Pu, which decays with a half-life of 87.7 years. RTGs using this material therefore diminish in power output by a factor of 1 – (1/2)^{1/87.7}, or 0.787%, per year.

One example is the MHW-RTG used by the Voyager probes. In the year 2000, 23 years after production, the radioactive material inside the RTG had decreased in power by 16.6%, i.e. providing 83.4% of its initial output; starting with a capacity of 470 W, after this length of time it would have a capacity of only 392 W. A related loss of power in the Voyager RTGs is the degrading properties of the bi-metallic thermocouples used to convert thermal energy into electrical energy; the RTGs were working at about 67% of their total original capacity instead of the 83.4% expected from radioactive decay alone. By the beginning of 2001, the power generated by the Voyager RTGs had dropped to 315 W for Voyager 1 and to 319 W for Voyager 2. By 2022, these numbers had dropped to around 220 W.

NASA has developed a multi-mission radioisotope thermoelectric generator (MMRTG) in which the thermocouples would be made of skutterudite, a cobalt arsenide (CoAs_{3}), which can function with a smaller temperature difference than the current tellurium-based designs. This would mean that an otherwise similar RTG would generate 25% more power at the beginning of a mission and at least 50% more after seventeen years. NASA hopes to use the design on the next New Frontiers mission.

== Safety ==
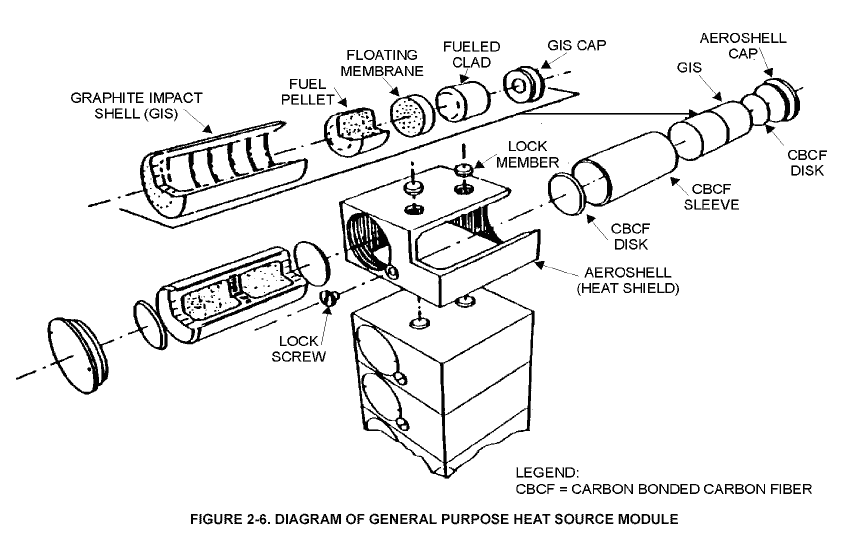
Diagram of a stack of general purpose heat source modules as used in RTGs

=== Theft ===
Radioactive materials in RTGs are dangerous and can be used for malicious purposes. They are not useful for a genuine nuclear weapon, but still can serve in a "dirty bomb". The Soviet Union constructed many uncrewed lighthouses and navigation beacons powered by RTGs using strontium-90 (^{90}Sr). They are very reliable and provide a steady source of power. Most have no protection, not even fences or warning signs, and the locations of some of these facilities are no longer known due to poor record keeping. In one instance, the radioactive compartments were opened by a thief. In another case, three woodsmen in Tsalenjikha Region, Georgia found two ceramic RTG orphan sources that had been stripped of their shielding; two of the woodsmen were later hospitalized with severe radiation burns after carrying the sources on their backs, and the third died. The units were eventually recovered and isolated.

There are about 1,000 such RTGs in Russia, all of which have long since exceeded their designed operational lives of ten years. Most of these RTGs likely no longer function, and may need to be dismantled. Some of their metal casings have been stripped by metal hunters, despite the risk of radioactive contamination. Transforming the radioactive material into an inert form reduces the danger of theft by people unaware of the radiation hazard (such as happened in the Goiânia accident in an abandoned Cs-137 source where the caesium was present in easily water-soluble caesium chloride form). However, a sufficiently chemically skilled malicious actor could extract a volatile species from inert material and/or achieve a similar effect of dispersion by physically grinding the inert matrix into a fine dust.

=== Radioactive contamination ===
RTGs pose a risk of radioactive contamination: if the container holding the fuel leaks, the radioactive material may contaminate the environment.

For spacecraft, the main concern is that if an accident were to occur during launch or a subsequent passage of a spacecraft close to Earth, harmful material could be released into the atmosphere; therefore their use in spacecraft and elsewhere has attracted controversy.

However, this event is not considered likely with current RTG cask designs. For instance, the environmental impact study for the Cassini–Huygens probe launched in 1997 estimated the probability of contamination accidents at various stages in the mission. The probability of an accident occurring which caused radioactive release from one or more of its three RTGs (or from its 129 radioisotope heater units) during the first 3.5 minutes following launch was estimated at 1 in 1,400; the chances of a release later in the ascent into orbit were 1 in 476; after that the likelihood of an accidental release fell off sharply to less than 1 in a million. If an accident which had the potential to cause contamination occurred during the launch phases (such as the spacecraft failing to reach orbit), the probability of contamination actually being caused by the RTGs was estimated at 1 in 10. The launch was successful and Cassini–Huygens reached Saturn.

To minimize the risk of the radioactive material being released, the fuel is stored in individual modular units with their own heat shielding. They are surrounded by a layer of iridium metal and encased in high-strength graphite blocks. These two materials are corrosion- and heat-resistant. Surrounding the graphite blocks is an aeroshell, designed to protect the entire assembly against the heat of reentering the Earth's atmosphere. The plutonium fuel is also stored in a ceramic form that is heat-resistant, minimising the risk of vaporization and aerosolization. The ceramic is also highly insoluble.

The plutonium-238 used in these RTGs has a half-life of 87.74 years, in contrast to the 24,110 year half-life of plutonium-239 used in nuclear weapons and reactors. Due to the shorter half-life, plutonium-238 is about 275 times more radioactive than plutonium-239 (i.e. 17.3 curies (640 GBq)/g compared to 0.063 curies (2.3 GBq)/g). For instance, 3.6 kg of plutonium-238 undergoes the same number of radioactive decays per second as 1 tonne of plutonium-239. Since the morbidity of the two isotopes in terms of absorbed radioactivity is almost exactly the same, plutonium-238 is around 275 times more toxic by weight than plutonium-239.

The alpha radiation emitted by either isotope will not penetrate the skin, but it can irradiate internal organs if plutonium is inhaled or ingested. Particularly at risk is the skeleton, the surface of which is likely to absorb the isotope, and the liver, where the isotope will collect and become concentrated.

A case of RTG-related irradiation is the Lia radiological accident in Georgia, December 2001. Strontium-90 RTG cores were dumped behind, unlabelled and improperly dismantled, near the Soviet-built Enguri Dam. Three villagers from the nearby village of Lia were unknowingly exposed to it and injured; one of them died in May 2004 from the injuries sustained. The International Atomic Energy Agency led recovery operations and organized medical care. Two remaining RTG cores are yet to be found as of 2022.

=== Accidents ===
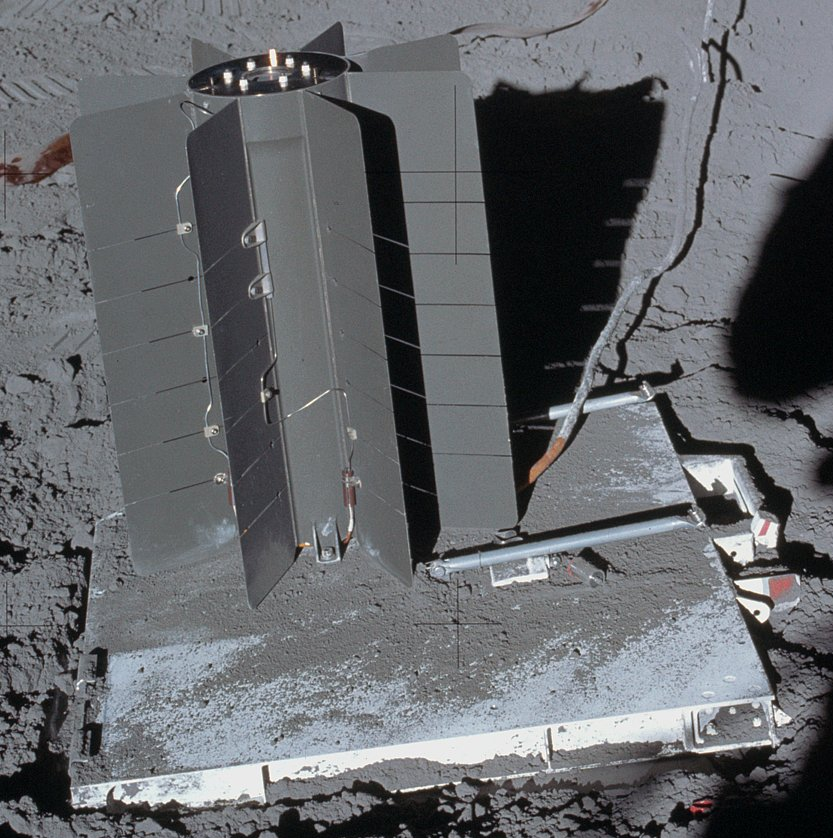
A SNAP-27 RTG deployed by the astronauts of Apollo 14 identical to the one lost in the reentry of Apollo 13

There have been several known accidents involving RTG-powered spacecraft:

1. A launch failure on 21 April 1964 in which the U.S. Transit-5BN-3 navigation satellite failed to achieve orbit and burned up on re-entry north of Madagascar. The 17,000 Ci (630 TBq) plutonium metal fuel in its SNAP-9a RTG was ejected into the atmosphere over the Southern Hemisphere where it burned up, and traces of plutonium-238 were detected in the area a few months later. This incident resulted in the NASA Safety Committee requiring intact reentry in future RTG launches, which in turn impacted the design of RTGs in the pipeline.
2. The Nimbus B-1 weather satellite, whose launch vehicle was deliberately destroyed shortly after launch on 21 May 1968 because of erratic trajectory. Launched from the Vandenberg Air Force Base, its SNAP-19 RTG containing relatively inert plutonium dioxide was recovered intact from the seabed in the Santa Barbara Channel five months later and no environmental contamination was detected.
3. In 1969 the launch of the first Lunokhod lunar rover mission failed, spreading polonium-210 over a large area of Russia.
4. The failure of the Apollo 13 mission in April 1970 meant that the Lunar Module reentered the atmosphere carrying an RTG and burned up over Fiji. It carried a SNAP-27 RTG containing 44,500 Ci (1,650 TBq) of plutonium dioxide in a graphite cask on the lander leg which survived reentry into the Earth's atmosphere intact, as it was designed to do, the trajectory being arranged so that it would plunge into 6–9 kilometers of water in the Tonga trench in the Pacific Ocean. The absence of plutonium-238 contamination in atmospheric and seawater sampling confirmed the assumption that the cask is intact on the seabed. The cask is expected to contain the fuel for at least 10 half-lives (870 years). The US Department of Energy has conducted seawater tests and determined that the graphite casing, which was designed to withstand reentry, is stable and no release of plutonium should occur. Subsequent investigations have found no increase in the natural background radiation in the area. The Apollo 13 accident represents an extreme scenario because of the high re-entry velocities of the craft returning from cis-lunar space (the region between Earth's atmosphere and the Moon). This accident has served to validate the design of later-generation RTGs as highly safe.
5. Mars 96 was launched by Russia in 1996, but failed to leave Earth orbit, and re-entered the atmosphere a few hours later. The two RTGs onboard carried in total 200 g of plutonium and are assumed to have survived reentry as they were designed to do. They are thought to now lie somewhere in a northeast–southwest running oval 320 km long by 80 km wide which is centred 32 km east of Iquique, Chile.

=== CIA loss of RTG in India ===
A SNAP-19C RTG was lost near the top of Nanda Devi mountain in India in 1965, when it was stored in a rock formation near the top of the mountain in the face of a snowstorm. It was intended to power a CIA remote automated intelligence station collecting telemetry from the Chinese rocket testing facility at Lop Nur. The seven capsules were probably carried down the mountain onto a glacier by a subsequent avalanche and have never been recovered. It is most likely that they melted through the glacier and were pulverized, whereupon the ^{238}Pu–Zr alloy fuel oxidized soil particles that are moving in a plume under the glacier. As the glaciers from these peaks feed some of India's largest rivers, including the Ganges, there are concerns about massive radioactive contamination originating from these RTGs. Accounts from the operatives who attempted the installation recounted that the sherpas who aided their mission jockeyed to carry the capsules as they produced heat; referring to the capsules as Guru Rinpoche, the warmth offered some respite from the freezing winds, but some of the operatives thought the capsules were inadequately shielded and irradiated the men around them.

=== Soviet use of RTGs ===
Many Beta-M RTGs produced by the Soviet Union to power lighthouses and beacons have become orphaned sources of radiation (such as in the Lia radiological accident). Its design allowed for the use of normal industrial bolts instead of intrinsically safe or safety interlocked bolts (most likely to reduce cost), and did not require the use of intrinsically safe opening mechanisms or made any use of tamper resistant shielding systems. Several of these units have also been illegally dismantled for scrap metal, or been exposed to storm conditions, freezing and water penetration, common issues in those abandoned in the harsh Russian arctic. Some have even fallen into the ocean, or have defective shielding due to poor design or physical damage. The US Department of Defense cooperative threat reduction program has expressed concern that material from the Beta-M RTGs can be used by terrorists to construct a dirty bomb.

However, the strontium titanate perovskite used is resistant to all likely forms of environmental degradation and cannot melt or dissolve in water. Bioaccumulation is unlikely as SrTiO_{3} passes through the digestive tract of humans or other animals unchanged, but the animal or human who ingested it would still receive a significant radiation dose to the sensitive intestinal lining during passage. Mechanical degradation of "pebbles" or larger objects into fine dust is more likely and could disperse the material over a wider area, however this would also reduce the risk of any single exposure event resulting in a high dose.

== See also ==
- Alkali-metal thermal to electric converter – Electrochemical device to convert heat
- Atomic battery – Devices generating electricity from radioisotope decay
- Betavoltaics – Type of nuclear battery which generates electric current
- Kilopower Reactor Using Stirling Technology – NASA project aimed at producing a nuclear reactor for space
- Optoelectric nuclear battery – Electric battery using nuclear energy
- Radioisotope heater unit – Device that provides heat through radioactive decay
- Radioactive isotope – Atom that has excess nuclear energy, making it unstable
- Stirling Radioisotope Generator – Type of atomic battery
- Thermionic converter – Power generation device
