= Alkaline earth metal =

Group of chemical elements

Alkaline earth metals
Hydrogen																															Helium
Lithium	Beryllium																									Boron	Carbon	Nitrogen	Oxygen	Fluorine	Neon
Sodium	Magnesium																									Aluminium	Silicon	Phosphorus	Sulfur	Chlorine	Argon
Potassium	Calcium															Scandium	Titanium	Vanadium	Chromium	Manganese	Iron	Cobalt	Nickel	Copper	Zinc	Gallium	Germanium	Arsenic	Selenium	Bromine	Krypton
Rubidium	Strontium															Yttrium	Zirconium	Niobium	Molybdenum	Technetium	Ruthenium	Rhodium	Palladium	Silver	Cadmium	Indium	Tin	Antimony	Tellurium	Iodine	Xenon
Caesium	Barium	Lanthanum	Cerium	Praseodymium	Neodymium	Promethium	Samarium	Europium	Gadolinium	Terbium	Dysprosium	Holmium	Erbium	Thulium	Ytterbium	Lutetium	Hafnium	Tantalum	Tungsten	Rhenium	Osmium	Iridium	Platinum	Gold	Mercury (element)	Thallium	Lead	Bismuth	Polonium	Astatine	Radon
Francium	Radium	Actinium	Thorium	Protactinium	Uranium	Neptunium	Plutonium	Americium	Curium	Berkelium	Californium	Einsteinium	Fermium	Mendelevium	Nobelium	Lawrencium	Rutherfordium	Dubnium	Seaborgium	Bohrium	Hassium	Meitnerium	Darmstadtium	Roentgenium	Copernicium	Nihonium	Flerovium	Moscovium	Livermorium	Tennessine	Oganesson
alkali metals ← → group 3
IUPAC group number	2
Name by element	beryllium group
Trivial name	alkaline earth metals
CAS group number (US, pattern A-B-A)	IIA
old IUPAC number (Europe, pattern A-B)	IIA

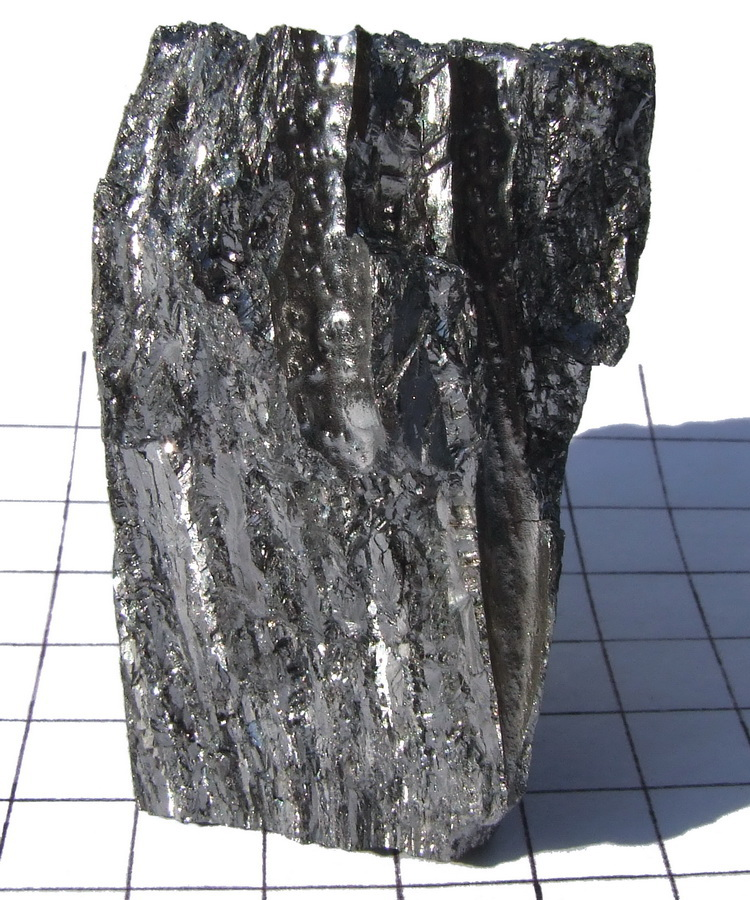
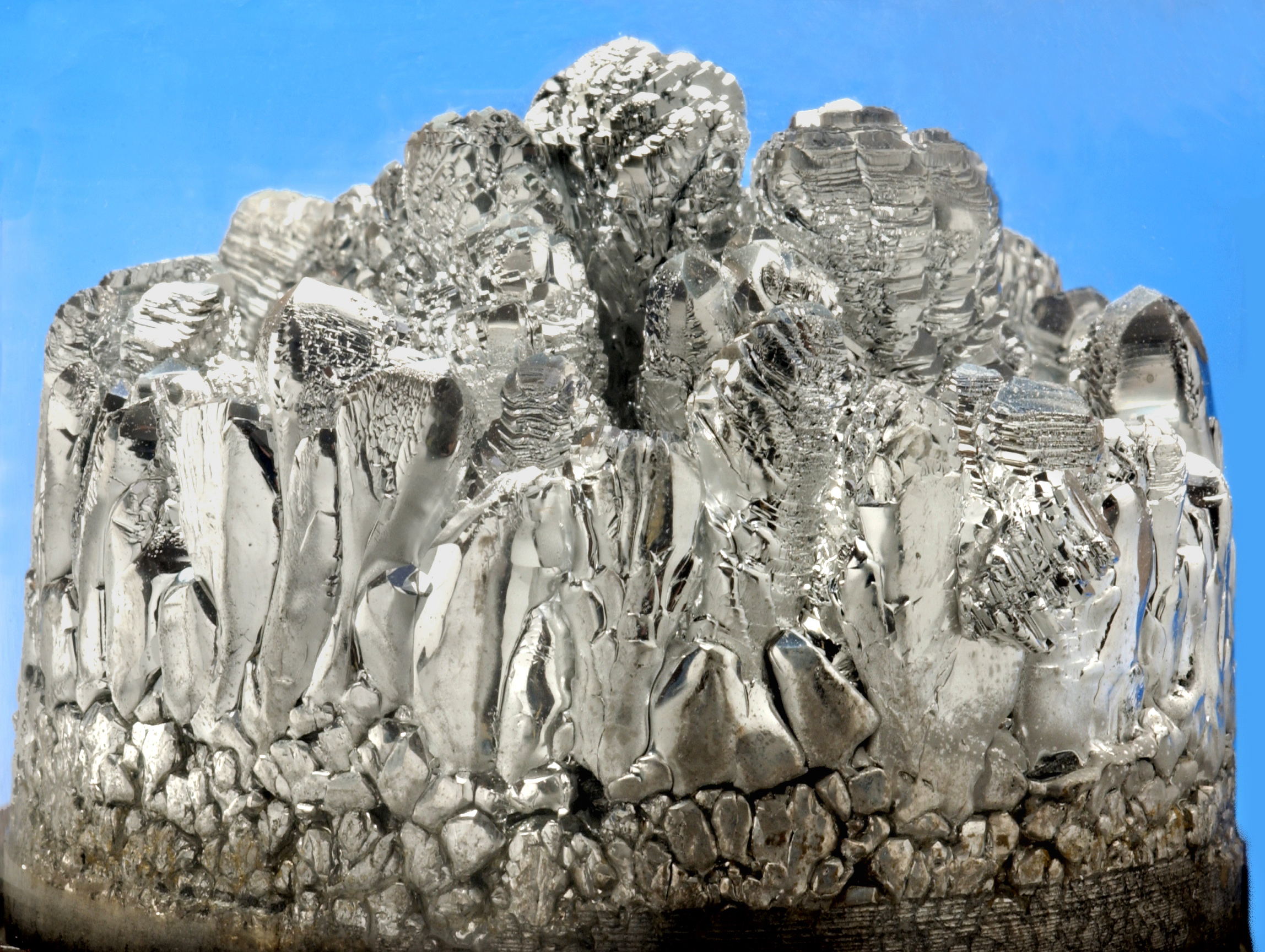
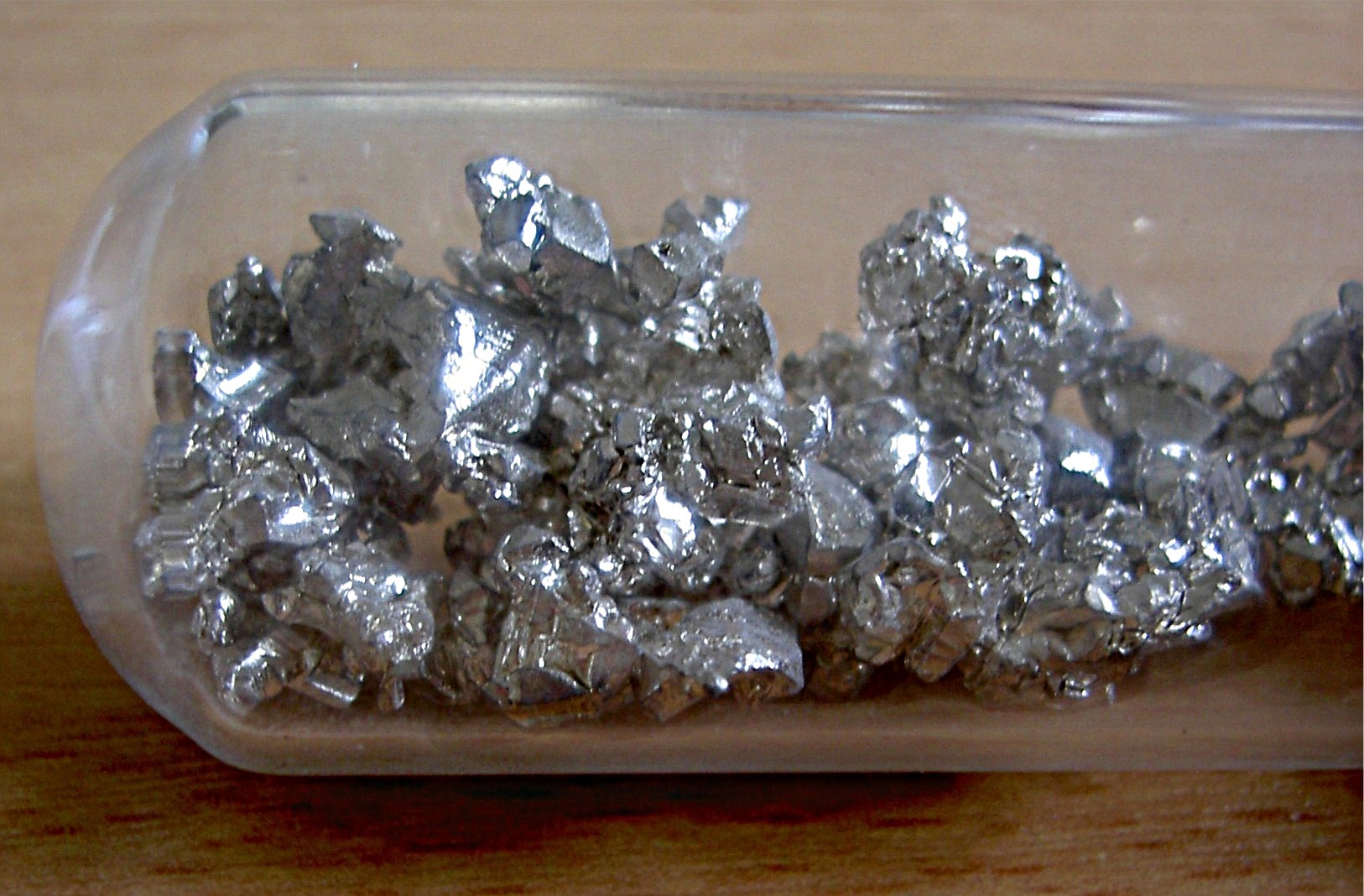
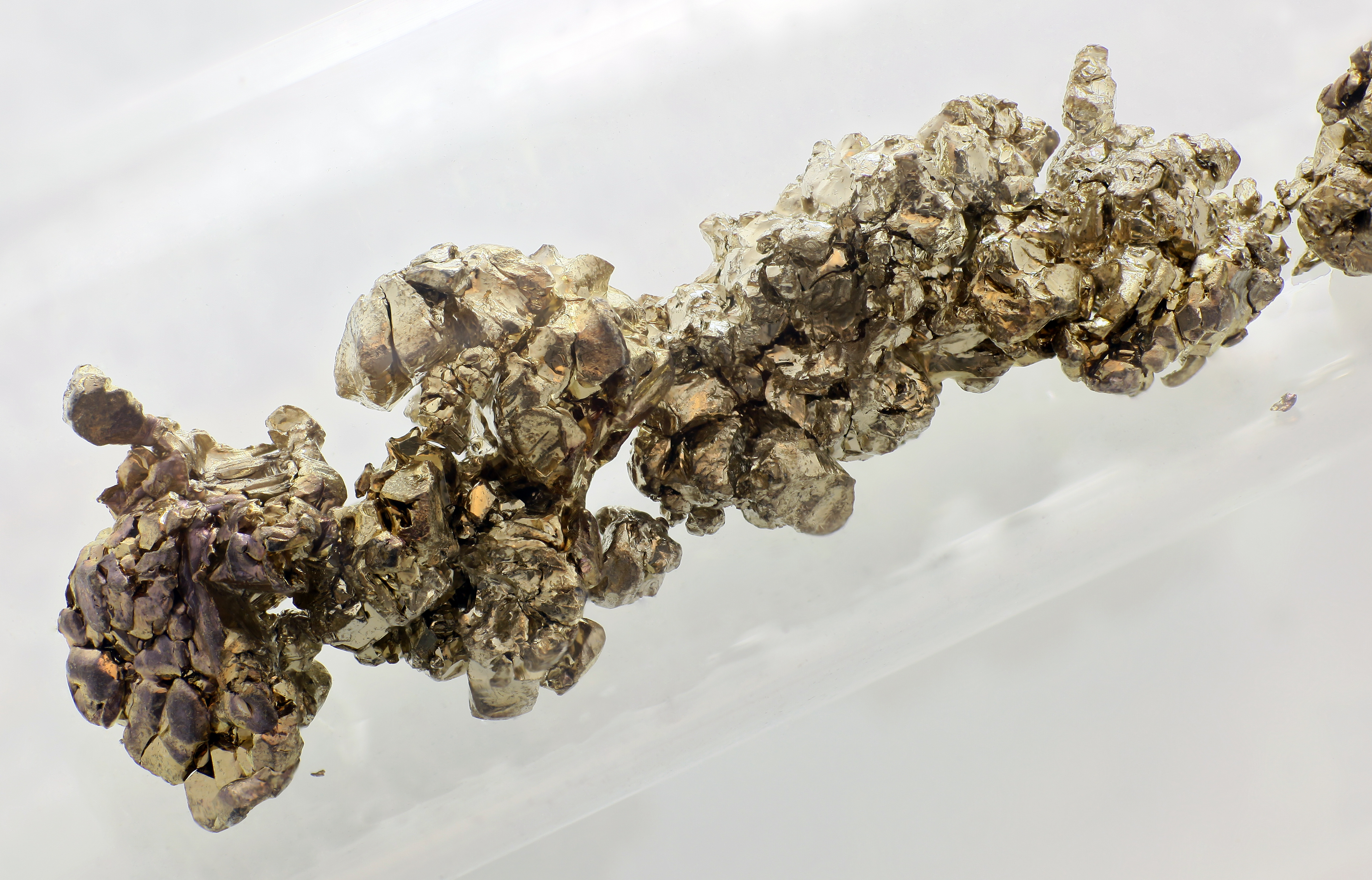
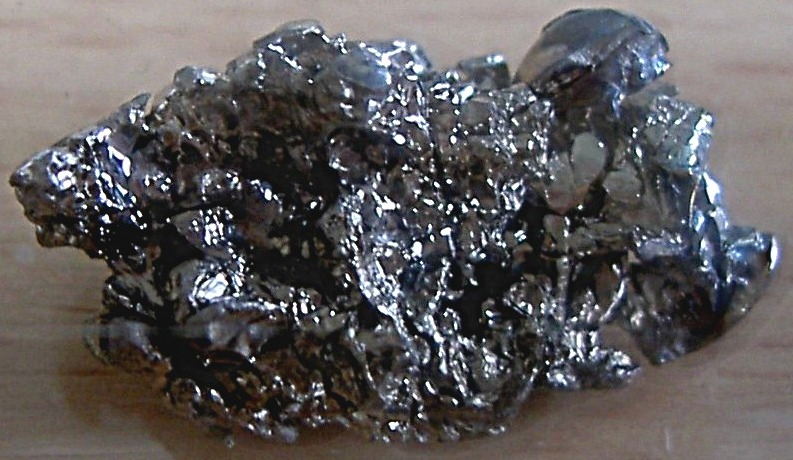
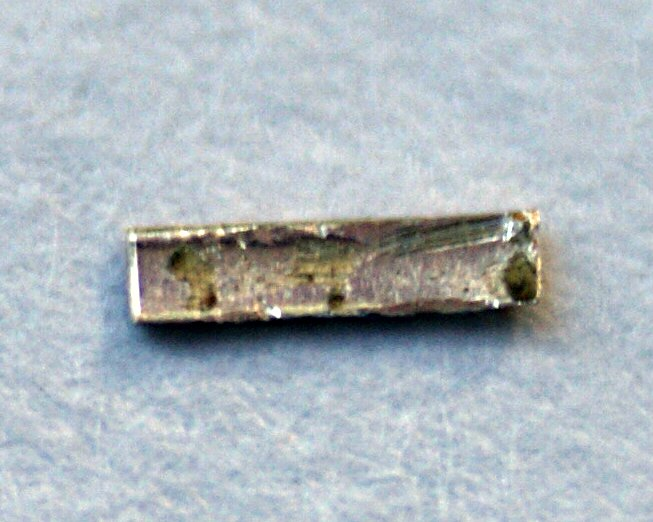
↓ Period
2	Beryllium (Be); 4
3	Magnesium (Mg); 12
4	Calcium (Ca); 20
5	Strontium (Sr); 38
6	Barium (Ba); 56
7	Radium (Ra); 88
Legend primordial element element by radioactive decay

The alkaline earth metals are six chemical elements in group 2 of the periodic table. They are beryllium (Be), magnesium (Mg), calcium (Ca), strontium (Sr), barium (Ba), and radium (Ra). The elements have very similar properties: they are all shiny, silvery-white, somewhat reactive metals, and they are less reactive than the alkali metals at standard temperature and pressure.

Together with helium, these elements have in common an outer s orbital which is full—that is, this orbital contains its full complement of two electrons, which the alkaline earth metals readily lose to form cations with charge +2, and an oxidation state of +2. Helium is grouped with the noble gases and not with the alkaline earth metals, but it is theorized to have some similarities to beryllium when forced into bonding and has sometimes been suggested to belong to group 2.

All the discovered alkaline earth metals occur in nature, although radium occurs only through the decay chain of uranium and thorium and not as a primordial element. There have been experiments, all unsuccessful, to try to synthesize element 120, the next potential member of the group.

== Characteristics ==
=== Chemical ===
As with other groups, the members of this family show patterns in their electronic configuration, especially the outermost shells, resulting in trends in chemical behavior:

Z	Element	Electrons per shell	Electron configuration (Note: Noble gas notation is used for conciseness; the nearest noble gas that precedes the element in question is written first, and then the electron configuration is continued from that point forward.)
4	beryllium	2, 2	[He] 2s^{2}
12	magnesium	2, 8, 2	[Ne] 3s^{2}
20	calcium	2, 8, 8, 2	[Ar] 4s^{2}
38	strontium	2, 8, 18, 8, 2	[Kr] 5s^{2}
56	barium	2, 8, 18, 18, 8, 2	[Xe] 6s^{2}
88	radium	2, 8, 18, 32, 18, 8, 2	[Rn] 7s^{2}

Most of the chemistry has been observed only for the first five members of the group. The chemistry of radium is not well-established due to its radioactivity; thus, the presentation of its properties here is limited.

The alkaline earth metals are all silver-colored and soft, and have relatively low densities, melting points, and boiling points. In chemical terms, all of the alkaline earth metals react with the halogens to form the alkaline earth metal halides, all of which are ionic crystalline compounds (except for beryllium chloride, beryllium bromide and beryllium iodide, which are covalent). All the alkaline earth metals except beryllium also react with water to form strongly alkaline hydroxides and, thus, should be handled with great care. The heavier alkaline earth metals react more vigorously than the lighter ones. The alkaline earth metals have the second-lowest first ionization energies in their respective periods of the periodic table because of their somewhat low effective nuclear charges and the ability to attain a full outer shell configuration by losing just two electrons. The second ionization energy of all of the alkaline metals is also somewhat low.

Beryllium is an exception: It does not react with water or steam unless at very high temperatures, and its halides are covalent. If beryllium did form compounds with an ionization state of +2, it would polarize electron clouds that are near it very strongly and would cause extensive orbital overlap, since beryllium has a high charge density. All compounds that include beryllium have a covalent bond. Even the compound beryllium fluoride, which is the most ionic beryllium compound, has a low melting point and a low electrical conductivity when melted.

All the alkaline earth metals have two electrons in their valence shell, so the energetically preferred state of achieving a filled electron shell is to lose two electrons to form doubly charged positive ions.

==== Compounds and reactions ====
The alkaline earth metals all react with the halogens to form ionic halides, such as calcium chloride (CaCl_{2}), as well as reacting with oxygen to form oxides such as strontium oxide (SrO). Calcium, strontium, and barium react with water to produce hydrogen gas and their respective hydroxides (magnesium also reacts, but much more slowly), and also undergo transmetalation reactions to exchange ligands.

Solubility-related constants for alkaline-earth-metal fluorides
Metal	M^{2+} hydration (-MJ/mol)	"MF_{2}" unit hydration (-MJ/mol)	MF_{2} lattice (-MJ/mol)	Solubility (mol/kL)
Be	2.455	3.371	3.526	soluble
Mg	1.922	2.838	2.978	1.2
Ca	1.577	2.493	2.651	0.2
Sr	1.415	2.331	2.513	0.8
Ba	1.361	2.277	2.373	6

=== Physical and atomic ===
Key physical and atomic properties of the alkaline earth metals
Alkaline earth metal	Standard atomic weight (Da) (Note: The number given in parentheses refers to the measurement uncertainty. This uncertainty applies to the least significant figure(s) of the number prior to the parenthesized value (i.e., counting from rightmost digit to left). For instance, 1.00794(7) stands for 1.00794±0.00007, whereas 1.00794(72) stands for 1.00794±0.00072.)	Melting point (K)	Melting point (°C)	Boiling point (K)	Boiling point (°C)	Density (g/cm^{3})	Electronegativity (Pauling)	First ionization energy (kJ mol^{−1})	Covalent radius (pm)	Flame test color
Beryllium	9.012182(3)	1560	1287	2744	2471	1.845	1.57	899.5	105	White
Magnesium	24.3050(6)	923	650	1363	1090	1.737	1.31	737.7	150	Brilliant-white
Calcium	40.078(4)	1115	842	1757	1484	1.526	1.00	589.8	180	Brick-red
Strontium	87.62(1)	1050	777	1655	1382	2.582	0.95	549.5	200	Crimson
Barium	137.327(7)	1000	727	2170	1897	3.594	0.89	502.9	215	Apple-green
Radium	[226] (Note: The element does not have any stable nuclides, and a value in brackets indicates the mass number of the longest-lived isotope of the element.)	969	696	2010	1737	5.502	0.9	509.3	221	Crimson red (Note: The color of the flame test of pure radium has never been observed; the crimson-red color is an extrapolation from the flame test color of its compounds.)

==== Isotopes ====
Isotopes of all six alkaline earth metals are present in the Earth's crust and the Solar System at varying concentrations, dependent upon the nuclides' half-lives and their nuclear stabilities. The first five have one, three, five, four, and six stable (or observationally stable) isotopes respectively, for a total of 19 stable nuclides, as listed here: beryllium-9; magnesium-24, -25, -26; calcium-40, -42, -43, -44, -46; strontium-84, -86, -87, -88; barium-132, -134, -135, -136, -137, -138. The four underlined isotopes in the list are predicted by radionuclide decay energetics to be only observationally stable and to decay with extremely long half-lives through double-beta decay, though no decays attributed definitively to these isotopes have yet been observed as of 2024. Radium has no stable nor primordial isotopes.

Apart from the 21 stable or nearly-stable isotopes, the six alkaline earth elements each possess a large number of known radioisotopes. None of the isotopes other than the aforementioned 21 are primordial; all have half-lives too short for even a single atom to have survived since the Solar System's formation, after the seeding of heavy nuclei by nearby supernovae and collisions between neutron stars, and any present are derived from ongoing natural processes. Beryllium-7, beryllium-10, and calcium-41, for example, are trace, as well as cosmogenic, nuclides, formed by the impact of cosmic rays with atmospheric or crustal atoms. The longest-lasting isotopes of each alkaline earth metal are: 1.387 million years for beryllium-10; 20.915 hours for magnesium-28; 99.4 thousand years for calcium-41; 28.90 years for strontium-90; 10.51 years for barium-133; and 1600 years for radium-226. All other radioisotopes have half-lives of around or shorter than half a decade, most significantly shorter.

In addition to the stable species, calcium and barium each have one extremely long-lived and primordial radionuclide: calcium-48 and barium-130, with half-lives of 5.6×10^{19} and 1.6×10^{21} years, respectively. Both are far longer than the current age of the universe (4.7 billion and 117 billion times longer, respectively) and less than one part per ten billion has decayed since the formation of the Earth. Calcium-48 and barium-130 decay only through double beta emission (Note: Calcium-48 is theoretically capable of single beta decay, but such process has never been observed.) and they have extremely long half-lives by virtue of the extremely low probability of both beta decays occurring at the same time. The two isotopes are stable for practical purposes.

Calcium-48 is the lightest nuclide known to undergo double beta decay. Naturally occurring calcium and barium are very weakly radioactive: calcium contains about 0.1874% calcium-48, and barium contains about 0.1062% barium-130. On average, one double-beta decay of calcium-48 will occur per second for every 90 tons of natural calcium, or 230 tons of limestone (calcium carbonate). Through the same decay mechanism, one decay of barium-130 will occur per second for every 16,000 tons of natural barium, or 27,000 tons of baryte (barium sulfate).

All isotopes of radium are highly radioactive and are primarily generated through the decay of heavier radionuclides. The longest-lived of them is radium-226, a member of the decay chain of uranium-238; it, along with radium-223, -224, and -228, occurs naturally in the decay chains of primordial thorium and uranium. The radioisotopes of alkaline earth metals tend to be "bone seekers" as they behave chemically similar to calcium, an integral component of hydroxyapatite in compact bone, and gradually accumulate in the human skeleton. The incorporated radionuclides inflict significant damage to the bone marrow over time through the emission of ionizing radiation, primarily alpha particles. This property is made use of in a positive manner in the radiotherapy of certain bone cancers, since the radionuclides' chemical properties causes them to preferentially target cancerous growths in bone matter, leaving the rest of the body relatively unharmed.

Strontium-90 and barium-140 are common fission products of uranium in nuclear reactors, accounting for 5.73% and 6.31% of uranium-235's fission products respectively when bombarded by thermal neutrons. The two isotopes have half-lives each of 28.90 years and 12.7 days. Strontium-90 is produced in appreciable quantities in operating nuclear reactors running on uranium-235 or plutonium-239 fuel, and a minuscule secular equilibrium concentration is also present due to rare spontaneous fission decays in naturally occurring uranium.

Beryllium-8 is notable by its absence as it splits in half virtually instantaneously into two alpha particles whenever it is formed. The triple alpha process in stars can only occur at energies high enough for beryllium-8 to fuse with a third alpha particle before it can decay, forming carbon-12. This thermonuclear rate-limiting bottleneck is the reason most main sequence stars spend billions of years fusing hydrogen within their cores, and only rarely manage to fuse carbon before collapsing into a stellar remnant, and even then merely for a timescale of ~1000 years. Beryllium is the only element with an even atomic number that is monoisotopic.

Compared to their neighbors in the periodic table, alkaline earth metals tend to have a larger number of stable isotopes as they all possess an even number of protons, owing to their status as group 2 elements. Their isotopes are generally more stable due to nucleon pairing. This stability is further enhanced if the isotope also has an even number of neutrons, as both kinds of nucleons can then participate in pairing and contribute to nuclei stability.

== History ==
=== Etymology ===
The majority of the alkaline earth metals are named after their oxides, the alkaline earths, whose old-fashioned names were beryllia, magnesia, lime, strontia, and baria. These oxides are basic (alkaline) when combined with water. "Earth" was a term applied by early chemists to nonmetallic substances that are insoluble in water and resistant to heating—properties shared by these oxides. The realization that these earths were not elements but compounds is attributed to the chemist Antoine Lavoisier. In his Traité Élémentaire de Chimie (Elements of Chemistry) of 1789 he called them salt-forming earth elements. Later, he suggested that the alkaline earths might be metal oxides, but admitted that this was mere conjecture. In 1808, acting on Lavoisier's idea, Humphry Davy became the first to obtain samples of the metals by electrolysis of their molten earths, thus supporting Lavoisier's hypothesis and causing the group to be named the alkaline earth metals.

Radium comes from the French word radium, originating from the Modern Latin radius, meaning ray, in recognition of radium's emission of energy in the form of rays.

=== Discovery ===
The calcium compounds calcite and lime have been known and used since prehistoric times. The same is true for the beryllium compounds beryl and emerald. The other compounds of the alkaline earth metals were discovered starting in the early 15th century. The magnesium compound magnesium sulfate was first discovered in 1618 by a farmer at Epsom in England. Strontium carbonate was discovered in minerals in the Scottish village of Strontian in 1790. The last element is the least abundant: radioactive radium, which was extracted from uraninite in 1898.

All elements except beryllium were isolated by electrolysis of molten compounds. Magnesium, calcium, and strontium were first produced by Humphry Davy in 1808, whereas beryllium was independently isolated by Friedrich Wöhler and Antoine Bussy in 1828 by reacting beryllium compounds with potassium. In 1910, radium was isolated as a pure metal by Curie and André-Louis Debierne also by electrolysis.

==== Beryllium ====
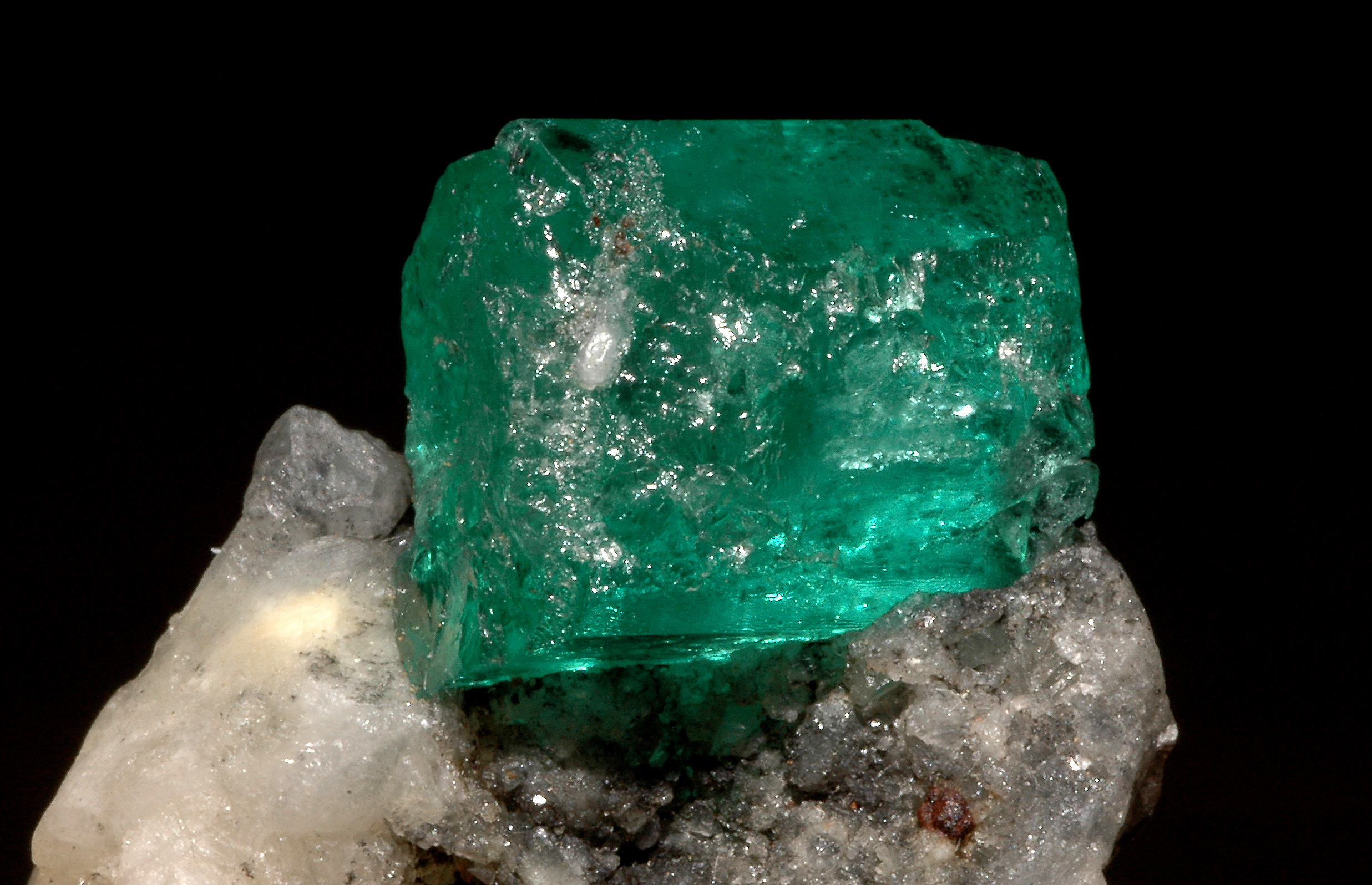
Emerald is a form of beryl, the principal mineral of beryllium.

Beryl, a mineral that contains beryllium, has been known since the time of the Ptolemaic Kingdom in Egypt. Although it was originally thought that beryl was an aluminum silicate, beryl was later found to contain a then-unknown element when, in 1797, Louis-Nicolas Vauquelin dissolved aluminum hydroxide from beryl in an alkali. In 1828, Friedrich Wöhler and Antoine Bussy independently isolated this new element, beryllium, by the same method, which involved a reaction of beryllium chloride with metallic potassium; this reaction was not able to produce large ingots of beryllium. It was not until 1898, when Paul Lebeau performed an electrolysis of a mixture of beryllium fluoride and sodium fluoride, that large pure samples of beryllium were produced.

==== Magnesium ====
Magnesium was first produced by Humphry Davy in England in 1808 using electrolysis of a mixture of magnesia and mercuric oxide. Antoine Bussy prepared it in coherent form in 1831. Davy's first suggestion for a name was magnium, but the name magnesium is now used.

==== Calcium ====
Lime has been used as a material for building since 7000 to 14,000 BCE, and kilns used for lime have been dated to 2,500 BCE in Khafaja, Mesopotamia. Calcium as a material has been known since at least the first century, as the ancient Romans were known to have used calcium oxide by preparing it from lime. Calcium sulfate has been known to be able to set broken bones since the tenth century. Calcium itself, however, was not isolated until 1808, when Humphry Davy, in England, used electrolysis on a mixture of lime and mercuric oxide, after hearing that Jöns Jakob Berzelius had prepared a calcium amalgam from the electrolysis of lime in mercury.

==== Strontium ====
In 1790, physician Adair Crawford discovered ores with distinctive properties, which were named strontites in 1793 by Thomas Charles Hope, a chemistry professor at the University of Glasgow, who confirmed Crawford's discovery. Strontium was eventually isolated in 1808 by Humphry Davy by electrolysis of a mixture of strontium chloride and mercuric oxide. The discovery was announced by Davy on 30 June 1808 at a lecture to the Royal Society.

==== Barium ====
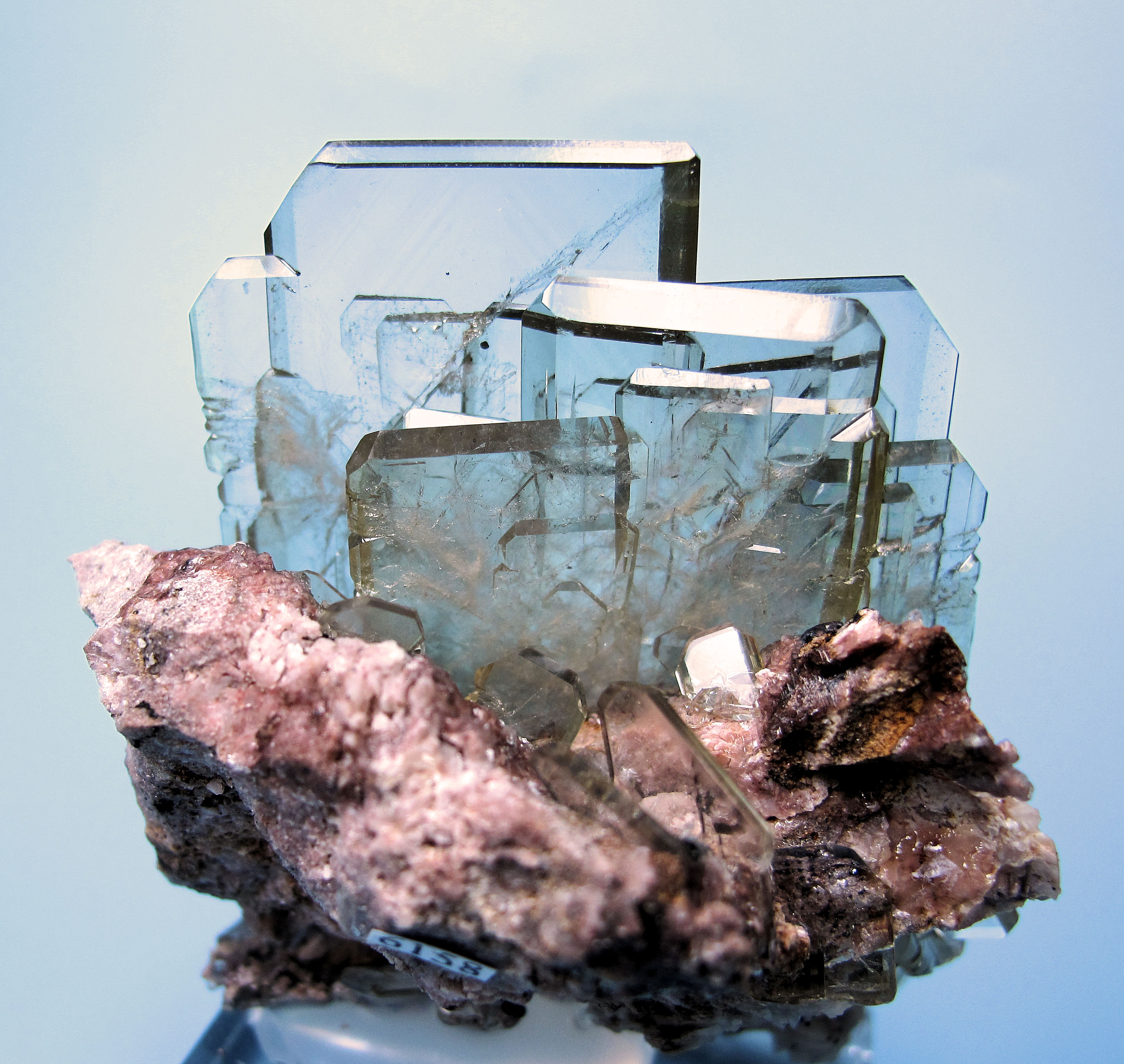
Barite, the material that was first found to contain barium.

Barite, a mineral containing barium, was first recognized as containing a new element in 1774 by Carl Scheele, although he was able to isolate only barium oxide. Barium oxide was isolated again two years later by Johan Gottlieb Gahn. Later in the 18th century, William Withering noticed a heavy mineral in the Cumberland lead mines, which are now known to contain barium. Barium itself was finally isolated in 1808 when Humphry Davy used electrolysis with molten salts, and Davy named the element barium, after baryta. Later, Robert Bunsen and Augustus Matthiessen isolated pure barium by electrolysis of a mixture of barium chloride and ammonium chloride.

==== Radium ====
While studying uraninite, on 21 December 1898, Marie and Pierre Curie discovered that, even after uranium had decayed, the material created was still radioactive. The material behaved somewhat similarly to barium compounds, although some properties, such as the color of the flame test and spectral lines, were much different. They announced the discovery of a new element on 26 December 1898 to the French Academy of Sciences. Radium was named in 1899 from the word radius, meaning ray, as radium emitted power in the form of rays.

== Occurrence ==
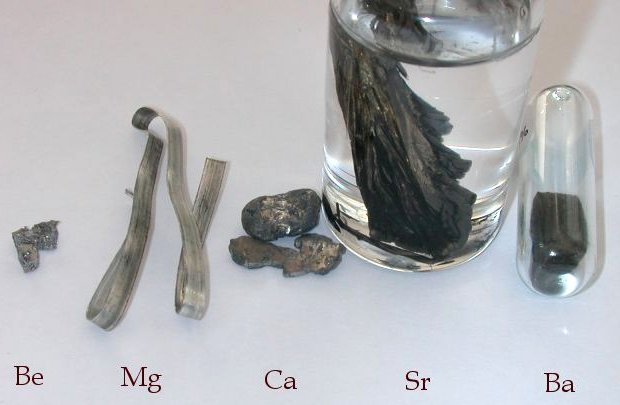
Series of alkaline earth metals.

Beryllium occurs in the Earth's crust at a concentration of two to six parts per million (ppm), much of which is in soils, where it has a concentration of six ppm. Beryllium is one of the rarest elements in seawater, even rarer than elements such as scandium, with a concentration of 0.2 parts per trillion. However, in freshwater, beryllium is somewhat more common, with a concentration of 0.1 parts per billion.

Magnesium and calcium are very common in the Earth's crust, being respectively the fifth and eighth most abundant elements. None of the alkaline earth metals are found in their elemental state. Common magnesium-containing minerals are carnallite, magnesite, and dolomite. Common calcium-containing minerals are chalk, limestone, gypsum, and anhydrite.

Strontium is the 15th most abundant element in the Earth's crust. The principal minerals are celestite and strontianite. Barium is slightly less common, much of it in the mineral barite.

Radium, being a decay product of uranium, is found in all uranium-bearing ores. Due to its relatively short half-life, radium from the Earth's early history has decayed, and present-day samples have all come from the much slower decay of uranium.

== Production ==
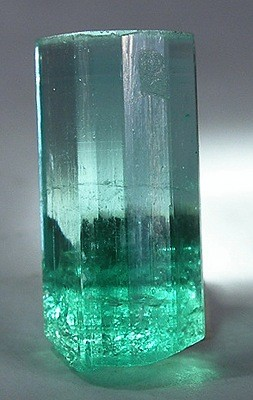
Emerald, colored green with trace amounts of chromium, is a variety of the mineral beryl which is beryllium aluminum silicate.

=== Beryllium ===
Most beryllium is extracted from beryllium hydroxide. One production method is sintering, done by mixing beryl, sodium fluorosilicate, and soda at high temperatures to form sodium fluoroberyllate, aluminum oxide, and silicon dioxide. A solution of sodium fluoroberyllate and sodium hydroxide in water is then used to form beryllium hydroxide by precipitation. Alternatively, in the melt method, powdered beryl is heated to high temperature, cooled with water, then heated again slightly in sulfuric acid, eventually yielding beryllium hydroxide. The beryllium hydroxide from either method then produces beryllium fluoride and beryllium chloride through a somewhat long process. Electrolysis or heating of these compounds can then produce beryllium.

=== Strontium ===
In general, strontium carbonate is extracted from the mineral celestite through two methods: by leaching the celestite with sodium carbonate, or in a more complicated way involving coal.

=== Barium ===
To produce barium, barite (impure barium sulfate) is converted to barium sulfide by carbothermic reduction (such as with coke). The sulfide is water-soluble and easily reacted to form pure barium sulfate, used for commercial pigments, or other compounds, such as barium nitrate. These in turn are calcined into barium oxide, which eventually yields pure barium after reduction with aluminum. The most important supplier of barium is China, which produces more than 50% of world supply.

=== Magnesium ===
Magnesium is usually produced from magnesite ore, as well as dolomite. When dolomite is crushed, roasted and mixed with seawater in large tanks, magnesium hydroxide settles to the bottom. Heating, mixing in coke, and reacting with chlorine, then produces molten magnesium chloride. This can be electrolyzed, releasing magnesium, which floats to the surface.

=== Calcium ===
Calcium is the fifth most abundant element in the Earth's crust, existing mostly as calcium carbonate. Other important minerals of calcium include gypsum, anhydrite, fluorite, and apatite. The largest producers of calcium in the world are China and Russia, where Davy's method of electrolysis is used on calcium chloride to produce the metal. Other large producers of calcium are the U.S. and Canada, where lime is reduced with aluminium at high temperatures.

=== Radium ===
Marie Skłodowska-Curie developed the first methods of radium extraction using residues of pitchblende, following her extraction of uranium. These residues contained mostly barium sulfate. A lengthy purification process involving boiling with sodium hydroxide, treating with hydrochloric acid, then adding sodium carbonate afforded a mixture of barium and radium carbonates, which could be converted to chlorides, and from which the radium salt could be separated via fractional crystallization. Curie's method was used until 1940, after which mixed bromides became more popular. As of 2011, radium is extracted only from spent reactor fuel as oxides. The pure metal can be isolated by reduction with aluminum in a vacuum at 1,200 °C.

== Applications ==
Beryllium is used mainly in military applications, but non-military uses exist. In electronics, beryllium is used as a p-type dopant in some semiconductors, and beryllium oxide is used as a high-strength electrical insulator and heat conductor. Beryllium alloys are used for mechanical parts when stiffness, light weight, and dimensional stability are required over a wide temperature range. Beryllium-9 is used in small-scale neutron sources that use the reaction ^{9}Be + ^{4}He (α) → ^{12}C + ^{1}n, the reaction used by James Chadwick when he discovered the neutron. Its low atomic weight and low neutron absorption cross-section would make beryllium suitable as a neutron moderator, but its high price and the readily available alternatives such as water, heavy water and nuclear graphite have limited this to niche applications. In the FLiBe eutectic used in molten salt reactors, beryllium's role as a moderator is more incidental than the desired property leading to its use.

Magnesium has many uses. It offers advantages over other structural materials such as aluminum, but magnesium's usage is hindered by its flammability. Magnesium is often alloyed with aluminum, zinc and manganese to increase its strength and corrosion resistance. Magnesium has many other industrial applications, such as its role in the production of iron and steel, and in the Kroll process for production of titanium.

Calcium is used as a reducing agent in the separation of other metals such as uranium from ore. It is a major component of many alloys, especially aluminum and copper alloys, and is also used to deoxidize alloys. Calcium has roles in the making of cheese, mortars, and cement.

Strontium and barium have fewer applications than the lighter alkaline earth metals. Strontium carbonate is used in the manufacturing of red fireworks. Pure strontium is used in the study of neurotransmitter release in neurons. Radioactive strontium-90 finds some use in RTGs, which utilize its decay heat. Barium is used in vacuum tubes as a getter to remove gases. Barium sulfate has many uses in the petroleum industry, and other industries.

Radium has many former applications based on its radioactivity, but its use is no longer common because of the adverse health effects and long half-life. Radium was frequently used in luminous paints, although this use was stopped after it sickened workers. The nuclear quackery that alleged health benefits of radium formerly led to its addition to drinking water, toothpaste, and many other products. Radium is no longer used even when its radioactive properties are desired because its long half-life makes safe disposal challenging. For example, in brachytherapy, shorter-lived alternatives such as iridium-192 are usually used instead.

== Representative reactions of alkaline earth metals ==
Reactions with halogens

Ca + Cl_{2} → CaCl_{2}

Anhydrous calcium chloride is a hygroscopic substance that is used as a desiccant. Exposed to air, it will absorb water vapour from the air, forming a solution. This property is known as deliquescence.

Reactions with oxygen

2 Ca + O_{2} → 2 CaO
2 Mg + O_{2} → 2 MgO

Reactions with sulfur

8 Ca + S_{8} → 8 CaS

Reactions with carbon

With carbon, they form acetylides directly. Beryllium forms carbide.

2 Be + C → Be_{2}C
CaO + 3 C → CaC_{2} + CO (at 2500 °C in furnace)
CaC_{2} + 2 H_{2}O → Ca(OH)_{2} + C_{2}H_{2}
Mg_{2}C_{3} + 4 H_{2}O → 2 Mg(OH)_{2} + C_{3}H_{4}

Reactions with nitrogen

Only Be and Mg form nitrides directly.

3 Be + N_{2} → Be_{3}N_{2}
3 Mg + N_{2} → Mg_{3}N_{2}

Reactions with hydrogen

Alkaline earth metals react with hydrogen to generate saline hydride that are unstable in water.

Ca + H_{2} → CaH_{2}

Reactions with water

Ca, Sr, and Ba readily react with water to form hydroxide and hydrogen gas. Be and Mg are passivated by an impervious layer of oxide. However, amalgamated magnesium will react with water vapor.

Mg + H_{2}O → MgO + H_{2}

Reactions with acidic oxides

Alkaline earth metals reduce the nonmetal from its oxide.

2 Mg + SiO_{2} → 2MgO + Si
2 Mg + CO_{2} → 2 MgO + C (in solid carbon dioxide)

Reactions with acids

Mg + 2 HCl → MgCl_{2} + H_{2}
Be + 2 HCl → BeCl_{2} + H_{2}

Reactions with bases

Be exhibits amphoteric properties. It dissolves in concentrated sodium hydroxide.

Be + NaOH + 2 H_{2}O → Na[Be(OH)_{3}] + H_{2}

Reactions with alkyl halides

Magnesium reacts with alkyl halides via an insertion reaction to generate Grignard reagents.

RX + Mg → RMgX (in anhydrous ether)

== Identification of alkaline earth cations ==
The flame test

The table below presents the colors observed when the flame of a Bunsen burner is exposed to salts of alkaline earth metals. Be and Mg do not impart colour to the flame due to their small size.

Metal	Colour
Ca	Brick-red
Sr	Crimson red
Ba	Green/Yellow
Ra	Carmine red

In solution

Mg^{2+}

Disodium phosphate is a very selective reagent for magnesium ions and, in the presence of ammonium salts and ammonia, forms a white precipitate of ammonium magnesium phosphate.

Mg^{2+} + NH_{3} + Na_{2}HPO_{4} → (NH_{4})MgPO_{4} + 2 Na^{+}

Ca^{2+}

Ca^{2+} forms a white precipitate with ammonium oxalate. Calcium oxalate is insoluble in water, but is soluble in mineral acids.

Ca^{2+} + (COO)_{2}(NH_{4})_{2} → (COO)_{2}Ca + NH_{4}^{+}

Sr^{2+}

Strontium ions precipitate with soluble sulfate salts.

Sr^{2+} + Na_{2}SO_{4} → SrSO_{4} + 2 Na^{+}

All ions of alkaline earth metals form white precipitate with ammonium carbonate in the presence of ammonium chloride and ammonia.

== Compounds of alkaline earth metals ==
Oxides

The alkaline earth metal oxides are formed from the thermal decomposition of the corresponding carbonates.

CaCO<_{3} → CaO + CO_{2} (at approx. 900 °C)

In laboratory, they are obtained from hydroxides:

Mg(OH)_{2} → MgO + H_{2}O

or nitrates:

2 Ca(NO_{3})_{2} → 2 CaO + 4 NO_{2} + O_{2}

The oxides exhibit basic character: they turn phenolphthalein red and litmus, blue. They react with water to form hydroxides in an exothermic reaction.

CaO + H_{2}O → Ca(OH)_{2} + Q

Calcium oxide reacts with carbon to form acetylide.

CaO + 3 C → CaC_{2} + CO (at 2500 °C)
CaC_{2} + N_{2} → CaCN_{2} + C
CaCN_{2} + H_{2}SO_{4} → CaSO_{4} + H_{2}N��CN
H_{2}N��CN + H_{2}O → (H_{2}N)_{2}CO (urea)
CaCN_{2} + 2 H_{2}O → CaCO_{3} + NH_{3}

Hydroxides

They are generated from the corresponding oxides on reaction with water. They exhibit basic character: they turn phenolphthalein pink and litmus, blue. Beryllium hydroxide is an exception as it exhibits amphoteric character.

Be(OH)_{2} + 2 HCl → BeCl_{2} + 2 H_{2}O
Be(OH)_{2} + NaOH → Na[Be(OH)_{3}]

Salts

Ca and Mg are found in nature in many compounds such as dolomite, aragonite, magnesite (carbonate rocks). Calcium and magnesium ions are found in hard water. Hard water represents a multifold issue. It is of great interest to remove these ions, thus softening the water. This procedure can be done using reagents such as calcium hydroxide, sodium carbonate or sodium phosphate. A more common method is to use ion-exchange aluminosilicates or ion-exchange resins that trap Ca^{2+} and Mg^{2+} and liberate Na^{+} instead:

Na_{2}O·Al_{2}O_{3}·_{6}SiO_{2} + Ca^{2+} → CaO·Al_{2}O_{3}·_{6}SiO_{2} + 2 Na^{+}

== Biological role and precautions ==
Magnesium and calcium is essential to all known living organisms. Magnesium is in plants, where it occurs in chlorophyll. Calcium ions play a large role in cell signaling, and calcium salts also take a structural role, most notably bones for vertebrates, and some shells in invertebrates.

Strontium plays an important role in marine aquatic life, especially hard corals, which use strontium to build their exoskeletons. In medicine, strontium compounds are employed in some toothpastes to reduce dental hypersensitivity. While strontium typically has a low toxicity, radioactive isotopes of strontium (like strontium-90) can be toxic. Since strontium-90 mimics calcium (i.e. Behaves as a "bone seeker"), it bio-accumulates with a significant biological half life, so long-term strontium-90 exposure at low concentrations can still damage the cells.

Barium has very little biological role, as soluble barium (Ba^{2+} ions) are toxic. However, in the Loxodes genus, an organelle known as a Müller vesicle contains barium salts, allowing the cell to orient themselves spatially using gravity. Barium, especially its sulfate compound (BaSO_{4}), is also used in medicine. Since barium sulfate has a low toxicity and relatively high density of 4.5g/cm^{3}, it is used as a radiocontrast agent in X-ray imaging ("barium meals" and "barium enemas")

Beryllium and radium, however, are toxic. Beryllium's low aqueous solubility means it is rarely available to biological systems; it has no known role in living organisms and, when encountered by them, is usually highly toxic. Acute exposure to beryllium, typically by inhalation, causes inflammation in the airways. Long-term exposure can cause berylliosis or Chronic beryllium disease (CBD). Radium has a low availability and is highly radioactive, making it toxic to life. Exposure to large amounts of radium may cause anemia, cataracts, teeth fracture and death. Furthermore, since radium emits gamma radiation, simply being near areas with high levels of radium may be hazardous.

== Extensions ==
The next alkaline earth metal after radium is thought to be element 120, although this may not be true due to relativistic effects. The synthesis of element 120 was first attempted in March 2007, when a team at the Flerov Laboratory of Nuclear Reactions in Dubna bombarded plutonium-244 with iron-58 ions; however, no atoms were produced, leading to a limit of 400 fb for the cross-section at the energy studied. In April 2007, a team at the GSI attempted to create element 120 by bombarding uranium-238 with nickel-64, although no atoms were detected, leading to a limit of 1.6 pb for the reaction. Synthesis was again attempted at higher sensitivities, although no atoms were detected. Other reactions have been tried, although all have been met with failure.

The chemistry of element 120 is predicted to be closer to that of calcium or strontium instead of barium or radium. This noticeably contrasts with periodic trends, which would predict element 120 to be more reactive than barium and radium. This lowered reactivity is due to the expected energies of element 120's valence electrons, increasing element 120's ionization energy and decreasing the metallic and ionic radii.

The next alkaline earth metal after element 120 has not been definitely predicted. Although a simple extrapolation using the Aufbau principle would suggest that element 170 is a congener of 120, relativistic effects may render such an extrapolation invalid. The next element with properties similar to the alkaline earth metals has been predicted to be element 166, though due to overlapping orbitals and lower energy gap below the 9s subshell, element 166 may instead be placed in group 12, below copernicium.

== See also ==
- Alkaline earth octacarbonyl complexes

== Bibliography ==
- Lide, David R. (2004). Handbook of Chemistry and Physics (84th ed.). CRC Press. ISBN 978-0-8493-0566-5.
- Weeks, Mary Elvira; Leichester, Henry M. (1968). Discovery of the Elements. Easton, PA: Journal of Chemical Education. LCCCN 68-15217.
- Wiberg, Egon; Wiberg, Nils; Holleman, Arnold Frederick (2001). Inorganic chemistry. Academic Press. ISBN 978-0-12-352651-9.
