= Lia radiological accident =

2001 radiation accident in the country of Georgia

Coordinates: 42°46′56″N 42°00′43″E

The Lia radiological accident began on December 2, 2001, with the discovery of two orphan radiation sources near the Enguri Dam in Tsalenjikha District in the country of Georgia. Three villagers from Lia were unknowingly exposed. All three men were injured, one of whom eventually died. The accident was a result of unlabeled radioisotope thermoelectric generator (RTG) cores which had been improperly dismantled and left behind from the Soviet era. The International Atomic Energy Agency (IAEA) led recovery operations and organized medical care.

== Source of the radioactive material ==
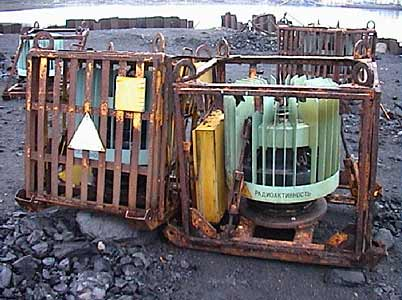
RTGs powered by strontium-90, in a decayed state. Similar to the ones in the Lia accident; however, the cores of the Lia RTGs were all that was left, and did not have steel frames or heat fins. All that remained was the unmarked core, which was a greyish metallic cylinder that held the radioactive material inside.

In the early 1980s, a series of eight radio relays were built to connect the Enguri Dam with the Hudoni Dam, which was under construction. The relays were in remote territory with no reliable access to electricity, and thus were powered with a series of eight radioisotope thermoelectric generators (RTGs) manufactured in 1983. Each RTG was a Beta-M type powered by strontium-90, and contained some 1295–1480 TBq of radioactivity. However, the Hudoni dam's construction was stopped as Georgian independence from the Soviet Union drew near. The stations and their RTGs were abandoned and eventually dismantled. The RTGs became lost at this time. Two were rediscovered in 1998, leading to no injuries. Two more were found in 1999, and again led to no injuries or significant radiation exposure. Two more were rediscovered in 2001, which led to the accident. The other two sources remain unaccounted for. The sources were not marked, and had been removed from the rest of the generator housing. They were heavy for their size, weighing 8–10 kg (18–22 lb) despite being only 10 cm × 15 cm (3.9 in × 5.9 in). Upon their recovery, it was determined the radiation emitted at the surface of the sources was 4.6 Sieverts (Sv) per hour. A fully absorbed whole-body dose of 5 Sv has a 50% chance of death. The original dose output at the time of their construction would have been much higher, but said output had decreased 40% since their construction due to radioactive decay. The actual dose received per hour would be lower unless physically touching the source, as radiation decreases with distance according to the inverse-square law.

== Accident ==
On 2 December 2001, three men from Lia (later designated as patients 1-DN, 2-MG, and 3-MB by the IAEA) had driven 45–50 km (28–31 mi) to a forest overlooking the Enguri Dam reservoir to gather firewood. They drove up a nearly impassable road in snowy winter weather, and discovered two canisters at around 6 pm. Around the canisters there was no snow for about a 1 m (3.3 ft) radius, and the ground was steaming. Patient 3-MB picked up one of the canisters and immediately dropped it, as it was very hot. Deciding that it was too late to drive back, and realizing the apparent utility of the devices as heat sources, the men decided to move the sources a short distance and make camp around them. Patient 3-MB used a stout wire to pick up one source and carried it to a rocky outcrop that would provide shelter. The other patients lit a fire, and then patients 3-MB and 2-MG worked together to move the other source under the outcrop. They ate dinner and had a small amount of vodka, while remaining close to the sources. Despite the small amount of alcohol, they all vomited soon after consuming it, the first sign of acute radiation syndrome (ARS), about three hours after first exposure. Vomiting was severe and lasted through the night, leading to little sleep. The men used the sources to keep them warm through the night, positioning them against their backs, and as close as 10 cm (3.9 in). The next day, the sources may have been hung from the backs of Patient 1-DN and 2-MG as they loaded wood onto their truck. They felt very exhausted in the morning and only loaded half the wood they intended. They returned home that evening.

== Aftermath ==
=== Medical ===
Two days after exposure, on December 4, patient 2-MG visited a local doctor but did not mention the mysterious heating source, and the doctor assumed he was drunk. The resulting treatment, however, did clear up the symptoms. On December 15, patients 1-DN and 2-MG developed burning and itching on the small of their backs, where the radiation source had been closest. Patient 1-DN lost his voice as well but did not seek care at that time. The wife of patient 3-MB and the brother of patient 2-MG learned that all three men were ill with similar symptoms, including increasing desquamation, especially on their backs. The wife and brother reached out to the police, who suggested that all three men seek medical attention. All three patients were finally hospitalized on December 22, and it was determined they had ARS. Patient 3-MB was released on January 23, 2002, as his injury was mild. The other patients remained in serious condition, and the Government of Georgia petitioned the IAEA for help treating them. The IAEA intervened: patient 1-DN was sent to Burnasyan Federal Medical Biophysical Center in Moscow, and Patient 2-MG was sent to the Percy military hospital in Paris. Patient 2-MG was hospitalized for over a year, and required extensive skin grafts, but survived and was discharged on March 18, 2003. Patient 1-DN's injuries lingered. He had received the greatest exposure on his back, as well as damage to his heart and vital organs. A large radiation ulcer formed on much of his upper left back. Despite intensive care, repeated antibiotics, multiple surgeries, and an attempted skin graft, the wound did not heal. His condition was complicated by tuberculosis, which prevented effective treatment of lung injury. He developed sepsis, and died of heart failure on May 13, 2004, 893 days after first exposure.

=== Doses ===
Radiation doses were estimated in several different ways, but it was clear that Patient 2-MG received the greatest dose. Below, doses are measured in grays. A whole-body dose of 10 Gy is 99% fatal, a dose of 6 Gy is 50% fatal with treatment, and a dose of 2 Gy is 5% fatal with treatment. Localized doses, especially where the patients suffered radiation ulcers, may have been much higher. Patient 1-DN, despite a survivable whole-body dose of between 2.8 and 5.4 Gy, received 21-37 Gy to his shoulder, which eventually killed him. In the chart below, there is some uncertainty in the measurements. The calibration curve method is from an assumed exposure time, distance, and rate. This is close to the doses determined by the measurements of chromosome aberrations taken from blood samples analyzed by the Georgia Cytogenetics Laboratory. Also included are doses calculated by the Dolphin method, which uses a slightly different detector. No other people in the area were found to have been exposed.

Estimated whole-body doses (Gy)
Source of estimate	Patient		
Source of estimate	1-DN	2-MG	3-MB
Calculated, calibration curve	3.1	4.4	1.3
Calculated, Dolphin method	5.4	5.7	1.9
Measured, Georgia Cytogenetics Laboratory	2.8	3.3	1.2
Measured, Georgia Cytogenetics Dolphin Method	3.0	4.3	2.3

=== Source recovery ===
The day after the hospitalization, Georgian authorities attempted to find the suspected radiation sources, but bad weather prevented them from reaching the site. On December 29 they tried again and ascertained the exact location, also shooting video footage. On January 4, 2002, the Georgian government appealed to the IAEA for help. A first attempt at recovering the sources was made two days later, but failed again due to weather. A fact-finding mission was led to determine how to best recover the sources, and their nature. The containers were extremely well built, which prevented the loss of radioactive material under all but the most extreme conditions. They had survived being abandoned in the woods for over a decade and had released no radioactive material. The radiation hazard was localized only, due to escaping ionizing radiation. For this reason, the IAEA had intended to wait until the spring thaw to recover the sources, but concerns by residents led the Georgian government to push for an early recovery. A tactically difficult recovery mission was successfully carried out on February 2–3, 2002.

The recovery mission faced numerous challenges, with winter weather being chief among them. The village of Potskho Etseri was used as the base of operations. A special container lined with 25 cm (9.8 in) of lead and weighing 5.5 metric tons (5.4 long tons; 6.1 short tons) was built for the purpose. An old military truck was converted for hauling the container. Special handling tools were created to manipulate the source and put it in a container. A group of 41 people were organized to take turns handling the source, with each person spending not more than 40 seconds near it. In the end, only 24 people were needed to actually be near the sources, and only those 24 people received significant doses. Worker radiation doses were monitored, and the highest dose was not more than 1.16 mSv, less than 10% of the dose of a full-body CT scan. The sources were successfully recovered, and carefully escorted by police back to a permanent storage location. Doses received between placing the sources in the truck and closing the lid over them were higher than expected due to the presence of a tarp over the truck. Inclement weather had prevented its removal, and the tarp reflected and scattered radiation back at the workers. The IAEA also noted that better tool design, as well as the use of more workers at a time to provide spotting capabilities, would have made the process faster and safer. Overall, the IAEA considered the recovery a success with no major safety issues.

== Analysis ==
The international symbol for ionizing radiation, conspicuously absent from the orphan sources

The IAEA's final report concluded that the proximate cause of the accident was that the sources were unmarked and unlabeled, and thus their danger could not be known. It also chastised the illegal abandonment of the sources to begin with. The report stressed the importance of basic knowledge of radiation injuries by clinicians and called for increased programs to make them aware of the signs of radiation overexposure. The initial clinician who treated patient 2-MG did not accurately assess the injury (partly due to 2-MG's failure to mention the orphan source), thus delaying proper treatment for almost three weeks.

Between the fall of the Soviet Union in 1991 and 2006, the IAEA had recovered some 300 orphan sources in Georgia, many lost from former industrial and military sites abandoned in the economic collapse after the Soviet breakup.
