= Beta-M =

Radioisotope thermoelectric generator

Diagram of the soviet radioisotopic thermoelectric generator "Beta-M". Black: Framework Blue: Outer radiation protection Yellow: Heat isolation Orange: Inner radiation protection (Tungsten) Red: Radionuclide heat source (Strontium-90) Pink: Thermoelectric unit Mounted above the assembly are fins for cooling, outlined in black.

The Beta-M is a radioisotope thermoelectric generator (RTG) that was used in Soviet-era lighthouses and beacons.

== Design ==
The Beta-M contains a core made up of strontium-90 (^{90}Sr), which has a half-life of 28.79 years. The service life of these generators is initially 10 years, and can be extended for another 5 to 10 years. The core is also known as radioisotope heat source 90 (RHS-90). In its initial state after manufacture, the generator is capable of generating 10 W of electricity. The generator contains the ^{90}Sr radioisotope, with a heating power of 250 W and 1480 TBq of radioactivity – equivalent to some 280 grams (9.9 oz) of ^{90}Sr. Mass-scale production of RTGs in the Soviet Union was the responsibility of a plant called Baltiyets, in Narva, Estonia.

== Safety incidents ==
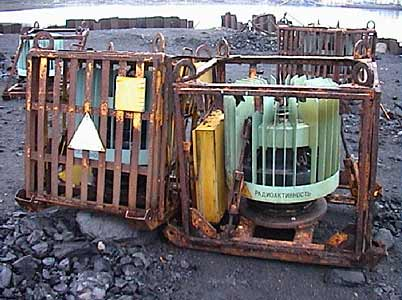
Soviet RTGs in dismantled and vandalized condition, powered by strontium-90 (^{90}Sr)

Some Beta-M generators have been subject to incidents of vandalism when scavengers disassembled the units while searching for non-ferrous metals. In December 2001 a radiological accident occurred when three residents of Lia, Georgia found parts of an abandoned Beta-M in the forest while collecting firewood. The three suffered burns and symptoms of acute radiation syndrome as a result of their exposure to the strontium-90 contained in the Beta-M. The disposal team that removed the radiation sources consisted of 25 men who were restricted to 40 seconds' worth of exposure each while transferring the canisters to lead-lined drums.

== Recovery efforts ==
It's estimated that over 1,000 Beta-M RTGs were initially produced and deployed by the Soviet Union, though they have been left mostly abandoned since the USSR collapsed. In order to reduce the risk of nuclear waste getting into the hands of the public or terrorist groups, the United States and European Union partnered with Russia to reacquire and disassemble these abandoned RTGs, collecting hundreds to be processed at the Mayak nuclear processing plant. Over 200 lighthouses and beacons that still required power had their power sources replaced with solar batteries. Despite efforts, dozens or even hundreds of Beta-M RTGs are estimated to still remain unaccounted for, unrecorded, or otherwise untouched in the Russian wilderness. Only 482 were recovered before the 2014 Russian annexation of Crimea, which caused international cooperation on the task to fall apart.
