= Strontium-90 =

Radioactive isotope of strontium

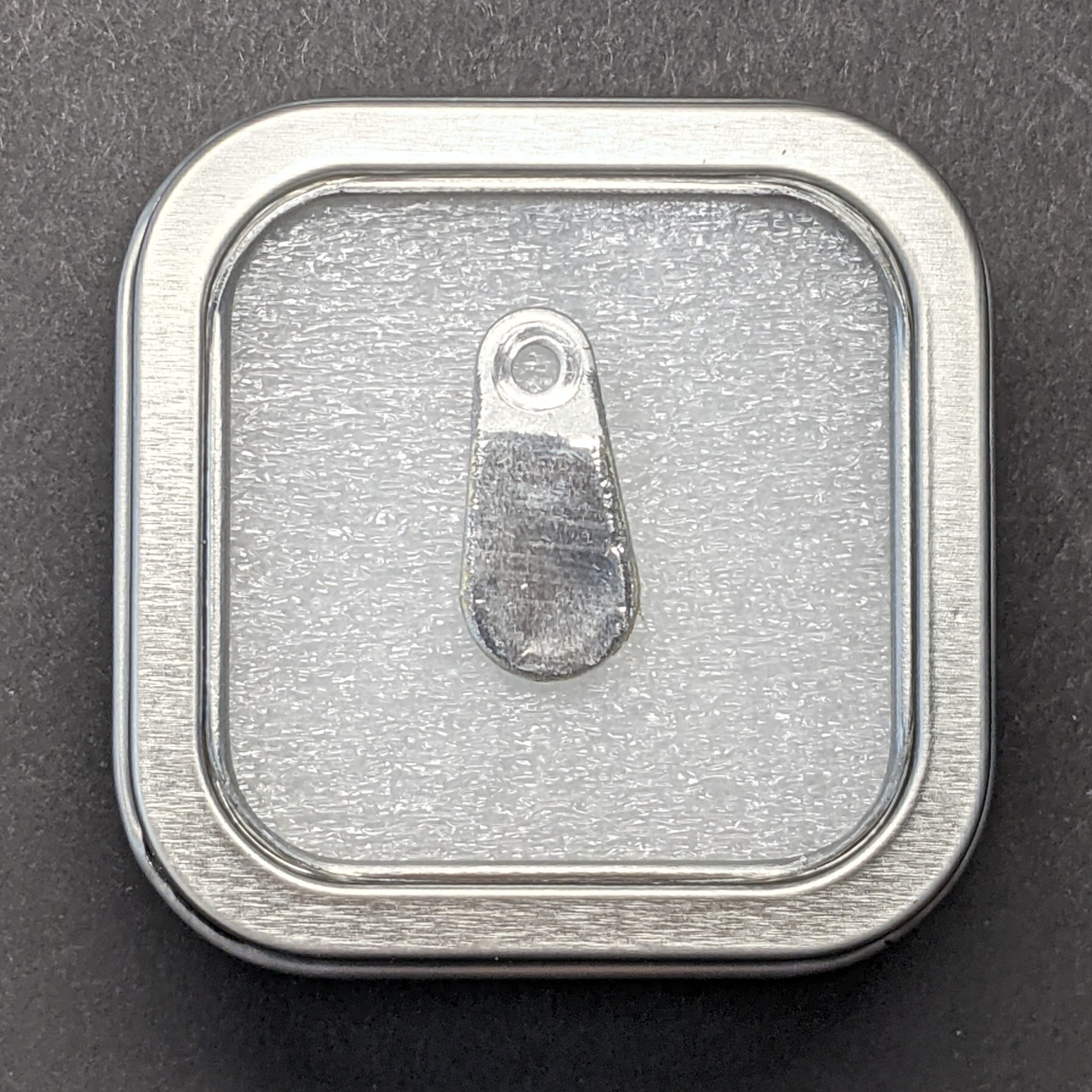
- Strontium-90 test source in tin

General
- Symbol: ^{90}Sr
- Names: strontium-90
- Protons (Z): 38
- Neutrons (N): 52

Nuclide data
- Natural abundance: syn
- Half-life (t_{1/2}): 28.91 years
- Isotope mass: 89.907728 Da
- Decay products: ^{90}Y

Decay modes
- Decay mode: Decay energy (MeV)
- Beta decay: 0.546

Strontium-90 (^{90}Sr) is a radioactive isotope of strontium produced by nuclear fission, with a half-life of 28.91 years. It undergoes β^{−} decay into ^{90}Y (yttrium-90) with a decay energy of 546 keV. ^{90}Sr has applications in medicine and industry and is an isotope of concern in fallout from nuclear weapons, nuclear weapons testing, and nuclear accidents.

== Radioactivity ==
Natural strontium (Sr) is nonradioactive and nontoxic at levels normally found in the environment, but ^{90}Sr is a radiation hazard. ^{90}Sr undergoes β^{−} decay with a half-life of 28.91 years and a decay energy of 546 keV distributed to an electron, an antineutrino, and ^{90}Y, which in turn undergoes β^{−} decay with a half-life of 64.05 hours and a decay energy of 2.28 MeV distributed to an electron, an antineutrino, and occasionally a gamma ray, leaving stable ^{90}Zr. The gamma-emitting branches are so weak that for most purposes ^{90}Sr and ^{90}Y can be considered pure beta particle emitters.

Medium-lived fission products
| Nuclide | t_{1/2} | Yield | Q (Note: Decay energy is split among β, neutrino, and γ if any.) | βγ |
| | (a) | (%) (Note: Per 65 thermal neutron fissions of ^{235}U and 35 of ^{239}Pu.) | (keV) | |
|---|---|---|---|---|
| ^{155}Eu | 4.74 | 0.0803 (Note: Neutron poison; in thermal reactors, most is destroyed by further neutron capture.) | 252 | βγ |
| ^{85}Kr | 10.73 | 0.2180 (Note: Less than 1/4 of mass-85 fission products as most bypass ground state: ^{85}Br → ^{85m}Kr → ^{85}Rb.) | 687 | βγ |
| ^{113m}Cd | 13.9 | 0.0008 | 316 | β |
| ^{90}Sr | 28.91 | 4.505 | 2826 (Note: Has decay energy 546 keV; its decay product ^{90}Y has decay energy 2.28 MeV with weak gamma branching.) | β |
| ^{137}Cs | 30.04 | 6.337 | 1176 | βγ |
| ^{121m}Sn | 43.9 | 0.00005 | 390 | βγ |
| ^{151}Sm | 94.6 | 0.5314 | 77 | β |

== Fission product ==
^{90}Sr is a product of nuclear fission. It is present in significant amount in spent nuclear fuel, in radioactive waste from nuclear reactors and in nuclear fallout from nuclear tests. For thermal neutron fission as in today's nuclear power plants, the fission product yield from uranium-235 is 5.7% and 6.6% from uranium-233, but only 2.0% from plutonium-239 (commercial reactors derive energy both from uranium-235 and plutonium-239 in comparable amounts).

=== Nuclear waste ===
^{90}Sr is classified as high-level waste. Its 29-year half-life means that it can take hundreds of years to decay to negligible levels. Exposure from contaminated water and food may increase the risk of leukemia and bone cancer. Reportedly, thousands of capsules of radioactive strontium containing millions of curies are stored at Hanford Site's Waste Encapsulation and Storage Facility.

=== Remediation ===
Algae has shown selectivity for strontium in studies, where most plants used in bioremediation have not shown selectivity between calcium and strontium, often becoming saturated with calcium, which is greater in quantity and also present in nuclear waste.

Researchers have looked at the bioaccumulation of strontium by Scenedesmus spinosus (algae) in simulated wastewater. The study claims a highly selective biosorption capacity for strontium of S. spinosus, suggesting that it may be appropriate for use of nuclear wastewater.

A study of the pond alga Closterium moniliferum using stable strontium found that varying the ratio of barium to strontium in water improved strontium selectivity.

== Biological effects ==
=== Biological activity ===
^{90}Sr is a "bone seeker" that exhibits biochemical behavior similar to calcium, the next lighter group 2 element. After entering the organism, most often by ingestion with contaminated food or water, about 70–80% of the dose gets excreted. Virtually all remaining ^{90}Sr is deposited in bones and bone marrow, with the remaining 1% remaining in blood and soft tissues. Its presence in bones can cause bone cancer, cancer of nearby tissues, and leukemia. Exposure to ^{90}Sr can be tested by a bioassay, most commonly by urinalysis.

The biological half-life of ^{90}Sr in humans has variously been reported as 14 to 600 days, 1,000 days, 18 years, 30 years and, at the upper limit, 49 years. The wide-ranging published biological half-life figures are explained by strontium's complex metabolism within the body. However, by averaging all excretion paths, the overall biological half-life is estimated to be about 18 years.

The elimination rate of ^{90}Sr is strongly affected by age and sex, due to differences in bone metabolism.

Together with cesium-134 (^{134}Cs), ^{137}Cs and iodine-131 (^{131}I), ^{90}Sr was among the most important isotopes regarding health impacts after the Chernobyl disaster. As strontium has an affinity to the calcium-sensing receptor of parathyroid cells that is similar to that of calcium, the increased risk of liquidators of the Chernobyl power plant to suffer from primary hyperparathyroidism could be explained by binding of ^{90}Sr.

== Uses ==
=== Radioisotope thermoelectric generators (RTGs) ===
The radioactive decay of ^{90}Sr generates a significant amount of heat, 0.920 W/g in the form of pure strontium metal or 0.445 W/g as strontium titanate and is cheaper than the alternative ^{238}Pu. It is used as a heat source in many Russian/Soviet radioisotope thermoelectric generators, usually in the form of strontium titanate. It was also used in the US "Sentinel" series of RTGs. Startup company Zeno Power is developing RTGs that use strontium-90 from the DOD, and is aiming to ship product by 2026.

=== Industrial applications ===
^{90}Sr finds use in industry as a radioactive source for thickness gauges.

=== Medical applications ===
^{90}Sr finds extensive use in medicine as a radioactive source for superficial radiotherapy of some cancers. Controlled amounts of ^{90}Sr or of ^{89}Sr can be used in treatment of bone cancer, and to treat coronary restenosis via vascular brachytherapy. It is also used as a radioactive tracer in medicine and agriculture.

=== Aerospace applications ===
^{90}Sr is used as a blade inspection method in some helicopters with hollow blade spars to indicate if a crack has formed.

=== Radiological warfare ===
In April 1943, Enrico Fermi suggested to Robert Oppenheimer the possibility of using the radioactive byproducts from enrichment to contaminate the German food supply. The background was fear that the German atomic bomb project was already at an advanced stage, and Fermi was also skeptical at the time that an atomic bomb could be developed quickly enough. Oppenheimer discussed the proposal with Edward Teller, who suggested the use of ^{90}Sr. James Bryant Conant and Leslie R. Groves were also briefed, but Oppenheimer wanted to proceed with the plan only if enough food could be contaminated with the weapon to kill half a million people.

== ^{90}Sr contamination in the environment ==
^{90}Sr is not quite as likely as ^{137}Cs to be released as a part of a nuclear reactor accident because it is much less volatile, but is probably the most dangerous component of the radioactive fallout from a nuclear weapon.

A study of hundreds of thousands of deciduous teeth, collected by Dr.Louise Reiss and her colleagues as part of the Baby Tooth Survey, found a large increase in ^{90}Sr levels through the 1950s and early 1960s. The study's final results showed that children born in St. Louis, Missouri, in 1963 had levels of ^{90}Sr in their deciduous teeth that was 50 times higher than that found in children born in 1950, before the advent of large-scale atomic testing. Reviewers of the study predicted that the fallout would cause increased incidence of disease in those who absorbed ^{90}Sr into their bones. However, no follow up studies of the subjects have been performed, so the claim is untested.

An article with the study's initial findings was circulated to U.S. President John F. Kennedy in 1961, and helped convince him to sign the Partial Nuclear Test Ban Treaty with the United Kingdom and Soviet Union, ending the above-ground nuclear weapons testing that placed the greatest amounts of nuclear fallout into the atmosphere.

The Chernobyl disaster released roughly 10 PBq, or about 5% of the core inventory, of ^{90}Sr into the environment. The Kyshtym disaster released ^{90}Sr and other radioactive material into the environment. It is estimated to have released 20 MCi (800 PBq) of radioactivity. The Fukushima Daiichi disaster had from the accident until 2013 released 0.1 to 1 PBq of ^{90}Sr in the form of contaminated cooling water into the Pacific Ocean.

== See also ==
- Gray (unit) and Sievert
- Lia radiological accident
- Radiation poisoning (disambiguation)
