= Lia, Georgia =

Lia Georgian: ლია
- Interactive map of Lia
- Coordinates: 42°39′23″N 42°00′31″E
- Country: Georgia
- Mkhare: Samegrelo-Zemo Svaneti
- Municipality: Tsalenjikha

Population (2014)
  - Total: 1,523
- Time zone: UTC+4 (Georgian Time)

Lia (Georgian: ლია) is a small town (daba) in northwestern Georgia located in the municipality of Tsalenjikha (province of Samegrelo-Zemo Svaneti) near the border with the Autonomous Republic of Abkhazia.

It is notable as the site of the 2001 Lia radiological accident.
