= Antoine Bussy =

French chemist (1794–1882)

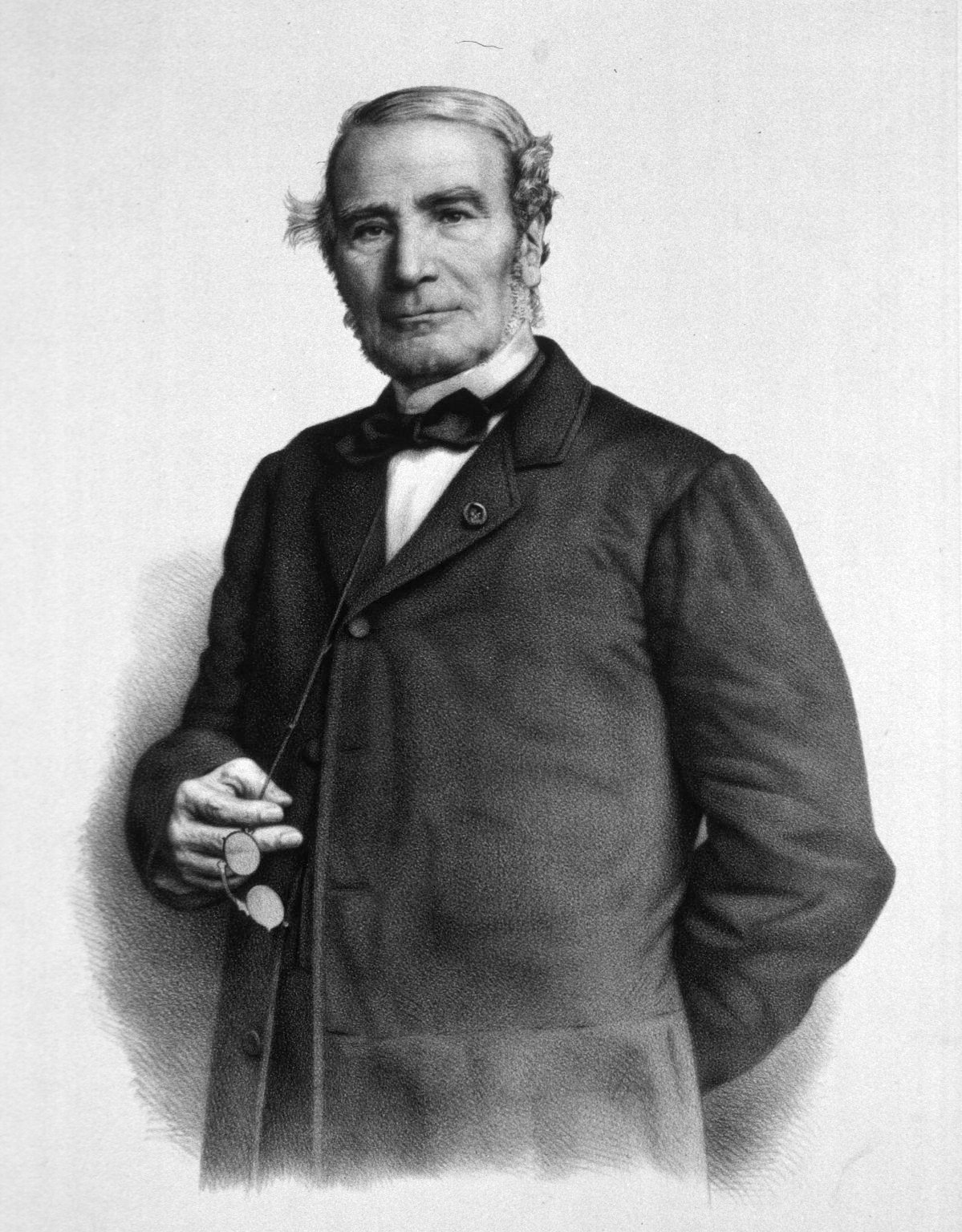
- Born: 29 May 1794; Marseille, France
- Died: 1 February 1882 (aged 87); Paris, France
- Known for: Beryllium
- Scientific career
- Fields: Chemistry

Antoine Alexandre Brutus Bussy (29 May 1794 – 1 February 1882) was a French chemist who primarily studied pharmaceuticals. He, alongside Friedrich Wöhler, first isolated beryllium.

== Education ==
Antoine Bussy entered the École Polytechnique in 1813, and there followed the courses delivered by Pierre Robiquet, the great French chemist who was to make decisive breakthroughs in bio-chemistry (he isolated the first amino-acid ever identified, asparagin, in 1805–1806), in industrial dyes (he isolated and identified alizarin, the most famous and first modern industrial red dye) and the pick-up of modern medication (he isolated, identified and started mass production of codeine, 1832). Robiquet tutored Antoine Bussy in his career as a chemist researcher and in his private career as pharmacist as well. In 1828, Bussy published a preliminary notice of a new method of preparing magnesium by heating magnesium chloride and potassium in a glass tube. When the potassium chloride was washed out, small globules of magnesium remained.
