= Bone seeker =

Chemical element that accumulates in bone tissue

A bone seeker is an element, often a radioisotope, that tends to accumulate in the bones of humans and other animals when introduced into the body.

For example, strontium and radium are chemically similar to calcium and can replace the calcium in bones. Plutonium is also a bone seeker, though the mechanism by which it accumulates in bone tissue is unknown.

Radioactive bone seekers are particular health risks as they irradiate surrounding tissue, though this can be useful for radiotherapy, such as in the case of radium-223. Stable bone seekers can also be harmful: excessive strontium absorption has been linked with increased levels of rickets. The salt strontium ranelate, however, is a bone seeker which is sometimes used to strengthen bones as a treatment for osteoporosis. Bone seekers have been proposed as a method of delivering antibiotics to infected bone tissue.

== See also ==
- ATC code V10 § V10B Pain palliation (bone seeking agents), a group of pharmaceutical bone seekers
