= Common beta emitters =

Lists radionuclides of technological importance

Various radionuclides emit beta particles (high-speed electrons or positrons) through radioactive decay of their atomic nucleus. These can be used in a range of different industrial, scientific, and medical applications. This article lists some common beta-emitting radionuclides of technological importance, and their properties.

== Fission products ==
=== Strontium ===
Strontium-90 is a commonly used beta emitter used in industrial sources. It decays to yttrium-90, which is itself a beta emitter. It is also used as a thermal power source in radioisotope thermoelectric generator (RTG) power packs. These use heat produced by radioactive decay of strontium-90 to generate heat, which can be converted to electricity using a thermocouple. Strontium-90 has a shorter half-life, produces less power, and requires more shielding than plutonium-238, but is cheaper as it is a fission product and is present in a high concentration in nuclear waste and can be relatively easily chemically extracted. Strontium-90 based RTGs have been used to power remote lighthouses. As strontium is water-soluble, the perovskite form strontium titanate is usually employed as it is not water-soluble and has a high melting point.

Strontium-89 is a short-lived beta emitter which has been used as a treatment for bone tumors; it is used in palliative care in terminal cancer cases. Both strontium-89 and strontium-90 are fission products.

== Neutron activation products ==
=== Tritium ===
Tritium is a low-energy beta emitter commonly used as a radiotracer in research and in self-powered lighting. The half-life of tritium is 12.3 years. The electrons from beta emission from tritium are so low in energy (average decay energy 5.7 keV) that a Geiger counter cannot be used to detect them. An advantage of the low energy of the decay is that it is easy to shield, since the low-energy electrons penetrate only to shallow depths, reducing the safety issues in deal with the isotope.

Tritium can also be found in metal work in the form of a tritiated rust, this can be treated by heating the steel in a furnace to drive off the tritium-containing water.

Tritium can be made by the neutron irradiation of lithium.

=== Carbon ===
Carbon-14 is also commonly used as a beta source in research, it is commonly used as a radiotracer in organic compounds. While the energy of the beta particles is higher than those of tritium they are still quite low in energy. For instance the walls of a glass bottle absorb it. Carbon-14 is made by the np reaction of nitrogen-14 with neutrons. It is generated in the atmosphere by the action of cosmic rays on nitrogen. Also a large amount was generated by the neutrons from the air bursts during nuclear weapons testing conducted in the 20th century. The specific activity of atmospheric carbon increased as a result of the nuclear testing but due to the exchange of carbon between the air and other parts of the carbon cycle it has now returned to a very low value. For small amounts of carbon-14, one of the favoured disposal methods is to burn the waste in a medical incinerator, the idea is that by dispersing the radioactivity over a very wide area the threat to any one human is very small.

=== Phosphorus ===
Phosphorus-32 is a short-lived high energy beta emitter, which is used in research in radiotracers. It has a half-life of 14 days. It can be used in DNA research. Phosphorus-32 can be made by the neutron irradiation (np reaction) of sulfur-32 or from phosphorus-31 by neutron capture.

=== Nickel ===
Nickel-63 is a radioisotope of nickel that can be used as an energy source in radioisotope piezoelectric generators. It has a half-life of 100.1 years. It can be created by irradiating nickel-62 with neutrons in a nuclear reactor.

== See also ==
- Betavoltaic device
- Commonly used gamma-emitting isotopes
- List of alpha-emitting nuclides
