= Diamond battery =

Proposed nuclear battery concept

Diamond battery is the name of a nuclear battery concept proposed by the University of Bristol Cabot Institute during its annual lecture held on 25 November 2016 at the Wills Memorial Building. This battery is proposed to run on the radioactivity of waste graphite blocks (previously used as neutron moderator material in graphite-moderated reactors) and would generate small amounts of electricity for thousands of years.

The battery is a betavoltaic cell using carbon-14 (^{14}C) in the form of diamond-like carbon (DLC) as the beta radiation source, and additional normal-carbon DLC to make the necessary semiconductor junction and encapsulate the carbon-14.

== Prototypes ==
Early prototypes use nickel-63 (^{63}Ni) as their source with diamond non-electrolytes/semiconductors for energy conversion, which are seen as a stepping stone to a ^{14}C diamond battery prototype.

=== University of Bristol prototype ===
In 2016, researchers from the University of Bristol claimed to have constructed one of those ^{63}Ni prototypes.

From their Frequently Asked Questions (FAQ document), the estimated power of a small C-14 cell is 15 J/day for thousands of years. (For reference, a AA battery of the same size has about 10 kJ total, which is equivalent to 15 J/day for just 2 years.) They note it is not possible to directly replace an AA battery with this technology, because an AA battery can produce bursts of much higher power as well. Instead, the diamond battery is aimed at applications where a low discharge rate over a long period of time is required, such as space exploration, medical devices, seabed communications, microelectronics, etc.

=== Moscow Institute of Physics and Technology prototype ===
In 2018, researchers from the Moscow Institute of Physics and Technology (MIPT), the Technological Institute for Superhard and Novel Carbon Materials (TISNCM), and the National University of Science and Technology MISIS announced a prototype using 2-micron thick layers of ^{63}Ni foil sandwiched between 200 10-micron diamond converters. It produced a power output of about 1 μW at a power density of 10 μW/cm^{3}. At those values, its energy density would be approximately 3.3 Wh/g over its 100-year half-life, about 10 times that of conventional electrochemical batteries. This research was published in April 2018 in the Diamond and Related Materials journal.

=== University of Bristol ^{14}C Battery ===
In December 2024, the University of Bristol announced that they had successfully created a battery using ^{14}C. The battery functions in a way similar to a photocell, but capturing electrons instead of light within the diamond.

== Carbon-14 ==
Researchers are trying to improve the efficiency and are focusing on use of radioactive ^{14}C, which is a minor contributor to the radioactivity of nuclear waste.

^{14}C undergoes beta decay, in which it emits a low-energy beta particle to become Nitrogen-14, which is stable (not radioactive).

^{14}_{6}C → ^{14}_{7}N + ^{0}_{−1}β

These beta particles, having an average energy of 50 keV, undergo inelastic collisions with other carbon atoms, thus creating electron-hole pairs which then contribute to an electric current. This can be restated in terms of band theory by saying that due to the high energy of the beta particles, electrons in the carbon valence band jump to its conduction band, leaving behind holes in the valence band where electrons were earlier present.

== Proposed manufacturing ==
In graphite-moderated reactors, fissile uranium rods are placed inside graphite blocks. These blocks act as a neutron moderator whose purpose is to slow down fast-moving neutrons so that nuclear chain reactions can occur with thermal neutrons. During their use, some of the non-radioactive carbon-12 and carbon-13 isotopes in graphite get converted into radioactive ^{14}C by capturing neutrons. When the graphite blocks are removed during station decommissioning, their induced radioactivity qualifies them as low-level waste requiring safe disposal.

Researchers at the University of Bristol demonstrated that a large amount of the radioactive ^{14}C was concentrated on the inner walls of the graphite blocks. Due to this, they propose that much of it can be effectively removed from the blocks. This can be done by heating them to the sublimation point of 3,915 K (3,642 °C; 6,587 °F) which will release the carbon in gaseous form. After this, blocks will be less radioactive and possibly easier to dispose of with most of the radioactive ^{14}C having been extracted.

Those researchers propose that this ^{14}C gas could be collected and used to produce man-made diamonds by a process known as chemical vapor deposition using low pressure and elevated temperature, noting that this diamond would be a thin sheet and not of the stereotypical diamond cut. The resulting diamond made of radioactive ^{14}C would still produce beta radiation which researchers claim would allow it to be used as a betavoltaic source. Researchers also claim this diamond would be sandwiched between non-radioactive man-made diamonds made from ^{12}C which would block radiation from the source and would also be used for energy conversion as a diamond semiconductor instead of conventional silicon semiconductors.

== Proposed applications ==
Due to its very low power density, conversion efficiency and high cost, a ^{14}C betavoltaic device is very similar to other existing betavoltaic devices which are suited to niche applications needing very little power (microwatts) for several years in situations where conventional batteries cannot be replaced or recharged using conventional energy harvesting techniques. Due to its longer half-life, ^{14}C betavoltaics may have an advantage in service life when compared to other betavoltaics using tritium or nickel. However, this will likely come at the cost of further reduced power density.

=== Commercialization ===
In September 2020, Morgan Boardman, a strategic advisory consultant with the Aspire Diamond Group at the South West Nuclear Hub of the University of Bristol, was appointed CEO of a new company called Arkenlight, which was created explicitly to commercialize their diamond battery technology and possibly other nuclear radiation devices under research or development at Bristol University. In September 2024, Arkenlight announced that they had created a ^{14}C diamond.
