= TSTA =

TSTA may refer to:

- Taiwan Strait Tourism Association
- Texas State Teachers Association
- Tritium Systems Test Assembly
