= Betavoltaic device =

Type of nuclear battery which generates electric current

A betavoltaic device (betavoltaic cell or betavoltaic battery) is a type of nuclear battery that generates electric current from beta particles (electrons or positrons) emitted from a radioactive source, using semiconductor junctions. A common source used is the hydrogen isotope tritium. Unlike most nuclear power sources which use nuclear radiation to generate heat which then is used to generate electricity, betavoltaic devices use a non-thermal conversion process, converting the electron–hole pairs produced by the ionization trail of beta particles traversing a semiconductor.

Betavoltaic power sources (and the related technology of alphavoltaic power sources) are particularly well-suited to low-power electrical applications where long life of the energy source is needed, such as implantable medical devices or military and space applications.

== History ==
Betavoltaics were invented in the 1970s. Some pacemakers in the 1970s used betavoltaics based on promethium, but were phased out as cheaper lithium batteries were developed.

Early semiconducting materials were inefficient at converting electrons from beta decay into current, requiring higher energy, more expensive—and potentially hazardous—isotopes. The more efficient semiconducting materials used as of 2019 can be paired with relatively benign isotopes such as tritium, which produce less radiation.

The Betacel, developed by Larry C. Olsen, was one of the earliest and most successful commercialized betavoltaic batteries, and would inform the design of modern betavoltaic devices such as NanoTritium batteries.

== Proposals ==
The primary use for betavoltaics is for remote and long-term use, such as spacecraft requiring electrical power for a decade or two. Recent progress has prompted some to suggest using betavoltaics to trickle-charge conventional batteries in consumer devices, such as cell phones and laptop computers. As early as 1973, betavoltaics were suggested for use in long-term medical devices such as pacemakers.

In 2018 a Russian design based on 2-micron thick nickel-63 slabs sandwiched between 10 micron diamond layers was introduced. It produced a power output of about 1 μW at a power density of 10 μW/cm^{3}. Its energy density was 3.3 kW⋅h/kg. The half-life of nickel-63 is 100 years.

In 2019 a paper indicated the viability of betavoltaic devices in high-temperature environments in excess of 733 K (460 °C; 860 °F) like the surface of Venus.

A prototype betavoltaic battery revealed in January 2024 by the Chinese startup company Betavolt contains a thin wafer providing a source of beta particles (either Carbon-14 or nickel-63) sandwiched between two thin crystallographic diamond semiconductor layers. The Chinese startup claims to have the miniature device in the pilot testing stage. Allegedly, it generates 100 microwatts of power at a voltage of 3V and has a lifetime of 50 years without any need for charging or maintenance. Betavolt claims it to be the first such miniaturised device ever developed, at a size of 15x15x15 millimeters. Its energy source is a sheet of nickel-63, an isotope that decays into stable, non-radioactive Cu-63 which poses no additional environmental threat.

In March 2025, researchers at Daegu Gyeongbuk Institute of Science and Technology (DGIST) developed a high-efficiency betavoltaic battery using carbon-14. Unlike traditional designs, it featured radiocarbon in both the anode and cathode, boosting energy conversion efficiency to 2.86%. A titanium dioxide semiconductor with a ruthenium-based dye enhanced electron transfer, creating an electron avalanche effect.

== Drawbacks ==
As radioactive material emits radiation, it slowly decreases in activity (refer to half-life). Thus, over time a betavoltaic device will provide less power. For practical devices, this decrease occurs over a period of many years. For tritium devices, the half-life is 12.32 years. In device design, one must account for what battery characteristics are required at end-of-life, and ensure that the beginning-of-life properties take into account the desired usable lifetime.

Liability connected with environmental laws and human exposure to tritium and its beta decay must also be taken into consideration in risk assessment and product development. Naturally, this increases both time-to-market and the already high cost associated with tritium. A 2007 report by the UK government's Health Protection Agency Advisory Group on Ionizing Radiation declared the health risks of tritium exposure to be double those previously set by the International Commission on Radiological Protection located in Sweden.

As radioactive decay cannot be stopped, sped up or slowed down, there is no way to "switch off" the battery or regulate its power output. For some applications this is irrelevant, but others will need a backup chemical battery to store energy when it isn't needed for when it is. This reduces the advantage of high energy density.

== Safety ==
Although betavoltaics use a radioactive material as a power source, the beta particles are low energy and easily stopped by a few millimetres of shielding. With proper device construction (that is, proper shielding and containment), a betavoltaic device would not emit dangerous radiation. Leakage of the enclosed material would engender health risks, just as leakage of the materials in other types of batteries (such as lithium, cadmium and lead) leads to significant health and environmental concerns. Safety can be further increased by transforming the radioisotope used into a chemically inert and mechanically stable form, which reduces the risk of dispersal or bioaccumulation in case of leakage.

== Availability ==
Betavoltaic nuclear batteries can be purchased commercially. Devices available as per 2012 included a 100 μW tritium-powered device weighing 20 grams.

== Efficiency ==
Due to the high energy density of radioisotopes (radioisotopes have orders of magnitude higher energy density than chemical energy sources, but much lower power density; the power density of a radioisotope is inversely proportional to its half-life (i.e., shorter half-life translates into higher power density), and the need for reliability above all else in many applications of betavoltaics, comparatively low efficiencies are acceptable. Current technology allows for single digit percentages of energy conversion efficiency from beta particle input to electricity output, but research into higher efficiency is ongoing. By comparison thermal efficiency in the range of 30% is considered relatively low for new large scale thermal power plants and advanced combined cycle power plants achieve 60% and more efficiency if measured by electricity output per heat input. If the betavoltaic device doubles as a radioisotope heater unit it is in effect a cogeneration plant and achieves much higher total efficiencies as much of the waste heat is useful. Similar to photovoltaics, the Shockley–Queisser limit also imposes an absolute limit for a single bandgap betavoltaic device.

=== Ultimate efficiency ===
Since the highest energy that can possibly be extracted from a single EHP is the bandgap energy, the ultimate efficiency of a beta-battery can be estimated as

$$\eta_\text{max}={E_\text{g} \over E_\text{EHP}} ,$$

where $E_\text{g}$ and $E_\text{EHP}$ are semiconductor band gap and electron–hole pair creation energy respectively. The energy to generate a single EHP by a beta-particle is known to scale linearly with the bandgap as $E_\text{EHP}=AE_\text{g}+B$ with A and B depending on the semiconductor characteristics.

== See also ==
- Atomic battery
- Diamond battery
- Optoelectric nuclear battery
- Polyvinylidene fluoride (PVDF) thin film technology
- Radioisotope thermoelectric generator
- Radioisotope piezoelectric generator
- List of battery types
