= Larry C. Olsen =

American scientist (1937–2020)

- Born: July 25, 1937
- Died: 17 March 2020 (aged 82); Kennewick, Washington, U.S.
- Education: University of Kansas; BS Engineering Physics; PhD Solid State Physics
- Occupation: Research Scientist
- Known for: Pioneering research in betavoltaic technology
- Awards: R&D 100 Award, DOE FLC Award, Tri-City Herald's Man of the Year

Larry C. Olsen (25 July 1937 – 17 March 2020) was a pioneer in the commercialization of betavoltaic technology. While working for the McDonnell Douglas Corporation in the 1970s, Olsen lead the development of the first commercially available betavoltaic nuclear battery and was named “Man of the Year” by the Tri-City Herald. Several hundred of these batteries were fabricated and some were used to power implanted heart pacemakers. Olsen published more than 80 articles in the fields of betavoltaics, photovoltaics, thermoelectric materials, and solid state physics. He earned several awards for his research, including the R&D 100 Award, presented each year by R&D Magazine.

Olsen's early work began as a research scientist with DWDL (1965 to 1974). He then became a professor of Materials Science and Engineering at Washington State University (1974 to 2001). He served as a staff scientist at the Pacific Northwest National Laboratory from 2000 until his retirement in 2009. In 2010 he joined City Labs as director of research, where he advised on the development of NanoTritium batteries.

== Career ==
=== Betavoltaic and Thermoelectric Energy Conversion ===
From 1967 to 1972, Olsen led research efforts in betavoltaic and thermoelectric energy conversion as a research scientist at DWDL. He led a team in developing the Betacel, the first commercial betavoltaic nuclear battery for cardiac pacemakers. The Betacel was based on Promethium 147 beta sources coupled to custom designed silicon devices. Betacel powered cardiac pacemakers were implanted in numerous patients in the 1970s. Biotronik GmbH & Co., Ingenieurburo, Berlin, adapted its chemical battery-powered pacemakers to accept the promethium-fueled betacel battery. The Betacel-Biotronik pacemaker began in Europe in 1972 and was extended to the United States under State of Washington license in 1973. By early 1973, over 60 implanted Betacel-Biotronik pacemakers were being monitored as part of the clinical investigation. By mid-1974, the United States Atomic Energy Commission (USAEC) had authorized the licensing in the United States of a Clinical Investigation Program that allowed the implantation of 50 Betacel-Biotronik pacemakers per month in major clinics in the U.S.

The Tri-Cities of Washington State named Olsen the 1970 Tri-Citian of the year. Olsen has continued to be involved in betavoltaic battery development, which includes consulting activities with government agencies.

Olsen served as a professor in the Materials Science & Engineering Department at Washington State University from 1974 to 2001. During that period he developed a photovoltaic research laboratory while maintaining teaching responsibilities. He carried out R&D work in solar cells based on silicon, CIGS, CdTe, GaAs and related III-V semiconductors. Olsen's efforts resulted in GaAs cells that were greater than 21% efficient when coupled to simulated solar illumination. GaAs cells were also developed for coupling to a monochromatic beam of photons with a wavelength of 850 nm. These cells converted 850 nm light to electrical power with an efficiency of 53% - the highest efficiency reported at the time produced for a cell irradiated with a monochromatic beam. For this research, Olsen was named WSU Distinguished Professor in Material Science in 1992.

Olsen developed programs in photovoltaics, thermoelectric energy conversion, and radiation detectors. He received the 2009 R&D 100 Award from R&D Magazine for work on advanced thin film thermoelectric materials and transfer of technology to industry.

== Education ==
Olsen graduated from the University of Kansas with a BS in Engineering Physics and a PhD in Solid State Physics.

== Awards ==
- 1970 - named Tri-City Herald “Man of the Year” for leading the development of the Betacel nuclear battery at DWDL.
- 1992-1993 - Distinguished Professor in Material Science at Washington State University, sponsored by the Westinghouse Hanford Co.
- 2009 - DOE FLC Award, given by the Department of Energy for transfer of technology to industry. The award was for the transfer of thermoelectric thin film fabrication techniques to Perpetua Power Source Technologies of Corvallis, Oregon.

== Selected publications ==
- "Nuclear Electric Power Sources for Biomedical Applications," Proc. 4th Intersociety Energy Conversion Engineering Conference 101(1969)
- "Betavoltaic Nuclear Electric Power Sources," ANS Trans. 12, 481(1969)
- "Beta Irradiation of Silicon Junction Devices: Effects of diffusion Length," IEEE Trans. on Nuclear Science NS19, 375(1972).
- "Betavoltaic Energy Conversion," Energy Conversion 13, 114 (1973).
- "Betacel Nuclear Batteries for Biomedical Applications," Proc. 8th Intersociety Energy Conversion Engineering Conference, 451(1973)
- "Advanced Betavoltaic Power Sources," Proc. 9th Intersociety Energy Conversion Engineering Conference, 754 (1974)
- "Vacuum-Evaporated Conducting ZnS Films," Appl. Phys. Letters 34, 528 (1979).
- "Experimental and Theoretical Studies of Cu_{2}O Solar Cells, " Solar Cells 7, 247 (1983)
- "Model Calculations of Silicon Inversion-Layer Solar Cells," Solar Cells 8, 371 (1983).
- "Solar Cells Based on GaP_{x}As_{1−x} Compounds," Proc. 13th IEEE Photovoltaic Specialists Conference, 972 (1978).
- "Physical Structure of Al-pSi MIS Solar Cells," Jour. Appl. Phys. 51, 6393 (1980).
- "Investigation of High Efficiency Silicon MINP Solar Cells," Solar Cells 17, 151 (1986).
- "Electro-Optical Characterization of GaAs Solar Cells," Proc. 19th IEEE Photovoltaic Specialists Conference, 238 (1987).
- "PC-1D Modeling of Depletion Layer Recombination in GaAs Solar Cells," Proc. 21st IEEE Photovoltaics Specialists Conference 415, May 21–25, 1990.
- "High Efficiency Monochromatic GaAs Solar Cells," Proc. 22nd IEEE Photovoltaic Specialists Conference, 419, Oct. 7–11, 1991.
- "Review of Betavoltaic Energy Conversion," Proc. XII Space Photovoltaic Research and Technology Conference, page 256, Oct. 20–22, 1992.
- "Efficient Direct ZnO/CIS Solar Cells," 13th NREL Photovoltaic Review, May 16–19, 1995, AIP Conf. Proceedings 353, pp 436–443, Harin S. Ullal and C. Edwin Witt, Editors.
- "High Efficiency CIGS and CIS Cells with CVD ZnO Buffer Layers," Proc. 26th IEEE Photovoltaic Specialists Conference, 363, September 29, 1997.
- "Effects of Moisture on CdTe Cell I-V Characteristics," Conference Record 2006 IEEE 4th World Conference on Photovoltaic Energy Conversion, pages 2138–2140, Waikola, HI, May 7–12, 2006.
- "Traps identification in Copper-Indium-Gallium-Sulfur-Selenide solar cells completed with various buffer layers by deep level transient spectroscopy," Thin Solid Films 515 (2006) 2625–2631.
- "Approaches to Encapsulation of Flexible CIGS Cells," Proc. SPIE Vol 7048, pages 7048O1-O8. Invited paper.

== Patents ==
- "Nuclear Battery," U.S. Patent 3,706,893
- "Process for Expanding Pyrolytic Graphite and Products Thereof," U.S. Patent 3,885,007
- "Thermoelectric Power Source Utilizing Ambient Energy Harvesting for Remote Sensing and Transmitting," U.S. Patent 7,834,263
