= Carbon label =

Isotopic labeling using carbon

Carbon label is a form of isotopic labeling where a carbon-12 atom is replaced with either a stable carbon-13 atom or radioactive carbon-11 or carbon-14 atoms in a chemical compound so as to 'tag' (i.e. label) that position of the compound to assist in determining the way a chemical reaction proceeds i.e. the reaction mechanism.

== See also ==
- Radiocarbon dating
