= Betacel =

Betavoltaic battery

Betacel is considered to be the first commercially successful betavoltaic battery. It was developed in the early 1970s by Larry C. Olsen at the American corporation McDonnell Douglas, using the radioisotope promethium-147 as the beta-electron source coupled to silicon semiconductor cells. This power source was incorporated in the Betacel-Biotronik heart pacemaker. The device was not widely adopted because of its limited lifespan and doubts over the use of radioactive material.

== Development ==
The betavoltaic program along with the development of the Betacel was led by Dr. Olsen and a team of researchers at Donald W. Douglas Laboratories (DWDL), McDonnell Douglas Corporation, in the early 1970s. As the first (and only) viable betavoltaic power source ever developed, it was immediately used to power heart pacemakers. Betacel powered cardiac pacemakers were implanted in numerous patients in the 1970s. Biotronik GmbH & Co., Ingenieurburo, Berlin, adapted its chemical battery-powered pacemakers to accept the promethium-fueled Betacel battery. The Betacel powered Biotronik pacemakers were considered to have useful lives of 7 to 10 years. Clinical investigation of the Betacel-Biotronik pacemaker began in Europe in 1972 and was extended to the United States under State of Washington license in 1973. By early 1973, over 60 implanted Betacel-Biotronik pacemakers were being monitored as part of the clinical investigation. By mid-1974, the USAEC had authorized the licensing in the United States of a Clinical Investigation Program that allowed the implantation of 50 Betacel-Biotronik pacemakers per month in major clinics in the U.S.

== Original technology ==
Betacels utilized Pm-147 beta sources that were combined with custom designed silicon p-n junctions. Operational configurations involved stacking unidirectional sources with Si p-n junctions in a series arrangement. The power output of the Betacel was approximately 400 μW. The power density of the battery was approximately 0.025 mW/cm^{3}. The battery itself was approximately one cubic inch in volume (16 cm^{3}). Most of the volume was used for shielding, to contain the gamma radiation that was emitted from the Pm-146 contaminant within the Pm-147.

These Betacel batteries presented an efficiency of approximately 4%. However, more efficient devices were in the development process utilizing bidirectional beta sources. These bi-directional source devices would have yielded efficiencies approaching 8%. However, these higher efficiency devices were never realized since pacemaker manufacturers focused on the use of lithium-ion batteries which did not utilize radioactive material, and could power pacemakers for 5 to 7 years.

Although previous betavoltaic devices degraded rapidly due to radiation damage, the Betacel showed no deleterious effects from radiation. The power levels decreased as expected. In particular, the battery power decreased exponentially with a half-life of 2.62 years, the same as that for Pm-147.

== Limitations and demise ==
Pm-147 is not an ideal source since the half-life is only 2.62 years and the contaminant Pm-146 emits gamma rays that require batteries to be well shielded. The material is toxic and not readily available. Moreover, at the time there was a certain stigma associated with the use of nuclear power and radioactive materials: the public was fearful and leery of any nuclear technology. This stigma, combined with advances in (and the lower cost of) lithium-ion battery technology, eventually overshadowed aspirations of a more lucrative future for the Betacel, relegating betavoltaic batteries to the realm of academic research in the years that immediately followed.

== Later developments in betavoltaic technology ==
The Betacel did not last but it provided a foundation for future betavoltaic technology research and sparked a resurgence of interest in betavoltaic power generation. Other sources such as tritium have been considered and implemented in the development of betavoltaic batteries. Between 2001 and 2010, four commercial companies (City Labs, Inc., BetaBatt Inc., Qynergy, Inc. and Widetronix, Inc.) have ventured into betavoltaic power cell development, while university research on the subject is still actively being conducted. Rapid advances in semiconductor and materials science technology, integrated circuit design and fabrication, and micro-/nano-scale microelectromechanical systems (MEMS), have converged to the extent that extremely small devices with diminutive power requirements are becoming more and more routine. These devices are ideally suited for betavoltaic power sources that can easily and safely offer nanowatt-to-microwatt power levels with enduring 20-year lifetimes.
