= NanoTritium batteries =

Nuclear battery

NanoTritium Batteries
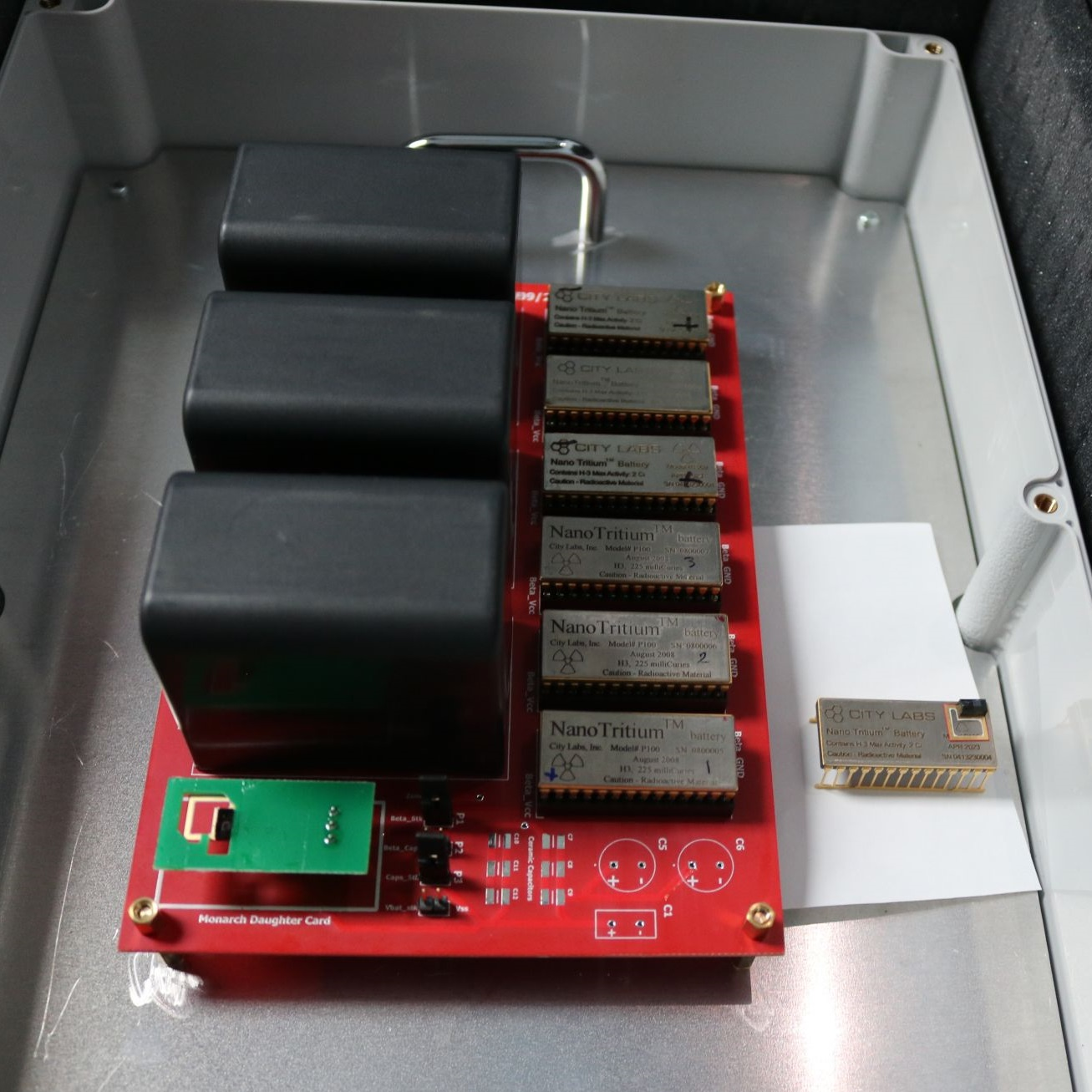
- NanoTritium batteries powering a circuit board (left) and a Michigan Micro Mote (right)
- Type: Betavoltaic device
- Inception: 2008
- Manufacturer: City Labs
- Models: P100 series
- Website: https://www.citylabs.net

NanoTritium batteries are ultra-low-power, long-life betavoltaic devices developed by City Labs, Inc. These nanowatt-to-microwatt batteries utilize the natural decay of tritium, a radioactive isotope of hydrogen, to generate continuous power for over 20 years.

== History ==
The NanoTritium battery was developed by City Labs, a company specializing in long-life tritium-based power solutions. The company was co-founded in 2005 by Peter Cabauy, a physicist with expertise in quantum information physics, and Denset Serralta. City Labs originated as part of the Office of Entrepreneurial Science at Florida International University, where Cabauy led efforts in technology commercialization and startup incubation. The company was eventually joined by Larry C. Olsen, founder of Betacel, who served as Director of Research.

In 2008, City Labs developed its first NanoTritium battery prototypes for encryption security memory backup power.

In 2010, City Labs became the first company in the betavoltaic industry to obtain a General License from the United States Nuclear Regulatory Commission (NRC), allowing the sale and distribution of tritium-based batteries without requiring specialized radiation handling licenses. To date, this is the only such license granted to the betavoltaic industry. The first commercially available tritium battery was released in 2012.

== Technology ==
NanoTritium batteries employ principles of betavoltaic conversion and radioactive beta decay rather than conventional electrochemical cells to generate power, harnessing electrons released as the contained tritium naturally decays into helium-3, a non-radioactive isotope. Current models are capable of producing an output voltage of 0.8 to 1.1 V with a current density of 150 nA/cm^{2}. Tritium's 12.32-year half-life and the relatively low amount of radiation emitted allow these batteries to safely output electrical power for decades. Testing performed by Lockheed Martin found NanoTritium batteries to be resistant to vibration, altitude, and temperatures ranging from -55°C to +150°C. Repeated temperature cycling had no effect on the performance of the batteries.

Current P100 series NanoTritium batteries are limited to powering low-power microelectronic devices.

== Development and Manufacturing ==
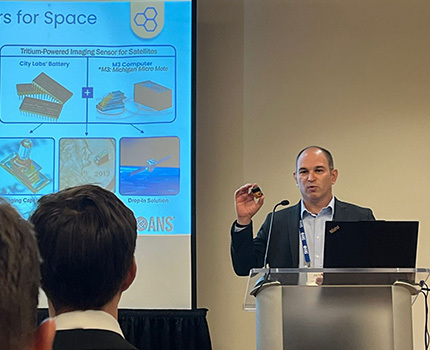
Cabauy presenting on applications for NanoTritium battery technology in space

NanoTritium batteries are designed and manufactured in Miami, Florida. City Labs has secured multiple Small Business Innovation Research grants from the U.S. Air Force, U.S. Space Force, and National Institutes of Health.

In 2024, Cabauy was awarded a NASA Innovative Advanced Concepts award for his proposed work on developing autonomous tritium micropowered sensors, designed to detect water and volatiles in permanently shadowed craters on the Moon.

== Applications ==
NanoTritium batteries have limited applications where there is no accessibility and long-term but very minimal power is beneficial. This includes powering components on COMSEC devices, satellites, unattended sensors, and implantable medical devices. Despite containing radioactive materials, the batteries are considered safe for implants due to their engineering and inherently low radiation levels, which prevent an individual from receiving a dose higher than the set 15 rem whole body limit even in the event of catastrophic failure. A significant drawback is their price (US$5200 as of 2023).

City Labs is also designing tritium-powered devices for NASA applications, including autonomous sensors for the Moon.
