= Optoelectric nuclear battery =

Electric battery using nuclear energy

An optoelectric nuclear battery (also radiophotovoltaic device, radioluminescent nuclear battery or radioisotope photovoltaic generator) is a type of nuclear battery in which nuclear energy is converted into light, which is then used to generate electrical energy. This is accomplished by letting the ionizing radiation emitted by the radioactive isotopes hit a luminescent material (scintillator or phosphor), which in turn emits photons that generate electricity upon striking a photovoltaic cell.

The technology was developed in 1961 by researchers at Eimac, at their San Carlos, CA facility, contracted by Sandia National Laboratories. The device was intended for use in satellites.

== Description ==
A beta emitter such as technetium-99 or strontium-90 is suspended in a gas or liquid containing luminescent gas molecules of the excimer type, constituting a "dust plasma". This permits a nearly lossless emission of beta electrons from the emitting dust particles. The electrons then excite the gases whose excimer line is selected for the conversion of the radioactivity into a surrounding photovoltaic layer such that a theoretical lightweight, low-pressure, high-efficiency battery can be realized. (In practice, existing designs are heavy and involve high pressure.) These nuclides are relatively low-cost radioactive waste from nuclear power reactors. The diameter of the dust particles is so small (a few micrometers) that the electrons from the beta decay leave the dust particles nearly without loss. The surrounding weakly ionized plasma consists of gases or gas mixtures (such as krypton, argon, and xenon) with excimer lines such that a considerable amount of the energy of the beta electrons is converted into this light. The surrounding walls contain photovoltaic layers with wide forbidden zones, such as diamond, which convert the optical energy generated from the radiation into electrical energy.

A German patent provides a description of an optoelectric nuclear battery, which would consist of an excimer of argon, xenon, or krypton (or a mixture of two or three of them) in a pressure vessel with an internal mirrored surface, finely-ground radioisotope, and an intermittent ultrasonic stirrer, illuminating a photocell with a bandgap tuned for the excimer. When the beta-emitting nuclides (e.g., krypton-85 or argon-39) emit beta particles, they excite their own electrons in the narrow excimer band at a minimum of thermal losses, so that this radiation is converted in a high-bandgap photovoltaic layer (e.g., in p-n diamond) very efficiently into electricity. The electric power per weight, compared with existing radionuclide batteries, can then be increased by a factor 10 to 50 or more. If the pressure vessel is made from carbon fiber/epoxy, the power-to-weight ratio is said to be comparable to an air-breathing engine with fuel tanks. The advantage of this design is that precision electrode assemblies are not needed, and most beta particles escape the finely-divided bulk material to contribute to the battery's net power.

=== Disadvantages ===
- High price of the radionuclides.
- High-pressure (up to 10 MPa or 100 bar) heavy containment vessel.
- A failure of containment would release high-pressure jets of finely-divided radioisotopes, forming an effective dirty bomb.

The inherent risk of failure is likely to limit this device to space-based applications, where the finely-divided radioisotope source is only removed from a safe transport medium and placed in the high-pressure gas after the device has left Earth orbit.

== As a DIY project ==
A simple betaphotovoltaic nuclear battery can be constructed from readily-available tritium vials (tritium-filled glass tubes coated with a radioluminescent phosphor) and solar cells. One design featuring 14 22.5x3mm tritium vials produced 1.23 microwatts at a maximum powerpoint of 1.6 volts. Another design combined the battery with a capacitor to power a pocket calculator for up to one minute at a time.

== See also ==
- Nuclear battery
- Betavoltaic device
- Radioisotopic thermoelectric generator
- Radioisotope piezoelectric generator
- List of battery types
