= Commonly used gamma-emitting isotopes =

Radionuclides which emit gamma radiation are valuable in a range of different industrial, scientific and medical technologies. This article lists some common gamma-emitting radionuclides of technological importance, and their properties.

== Fission products ==
Many artificial radionuclides of technological importance are produced as fission products within nuclear reactors. A fission product is a nucleus with approximately half the mass of a uranium or plutonium nucleus which is left over after such a nucleus has been "split" in a nuclear fission reaction.

Caesium-137 is one such radionuclide. It has a half-life of 30 years, and decays by beta decay without gamma ray emission to a metastable state of barium-137 (^{137m}Ba). Barium-137m has a half-life of a 2.6 minutes and is responsible for all of the gamma ray emission in this decay sequence. The ground state of barium-137 is stable.

The photon energy (energy of a single gamma ray) of ^{137m}Ba is about 662 keV. These gamma rays can be used, for example, in radiotherapy such as for the treatment of cancer, in food irradiation, or in industrial gauges or sensors. ^{137}Cs is not widely used for industrial radiography as other nuclides, such as cobalt-60 or iridium-192, offer higher radiation output for a given volume.

Iodine-131 is another important gamma-emitting radionuclide produced as a fission product. With a short half-life of 8 days, this radioisotope is not of practical use in radioactive sources in industrial radiography or sensing. However, since iodine is a component of biological molecules such as thyroid hormones, iodine-131 is of great importance in nuclear medicine, and in medical and biological research as a radioactive tracer.

Lanthanum-140 is a decay product of barium-140, a common fission product. It is a potent gamma emitter. It was used in high quantities during the Manhattan Project for the RaLa Experiments.

== Activation products ==
Some radionuclides, such as cobalt-60 and iridium-192, are made by the neutron irradiation of normal non-radioactive cobalt and iridium metal in a nuclear reactor, creating radioactive nuclides of these elements which contain extra neutrons, compared to the original stable nuclides.

In addition to their uses in radiography, both cobalt-60 (^{60}Co) and iridium-192 (^{192}Ir) are used in the radiotherapy of cancer. Cobalt-60 tends to be used in teletherapy units as a higher photon energy alternative to caesium-137, while iridium-192 tends to be used in a different mode of therapy, internal radiotherapy or brachytherapy. The iridium wires for brachytherapy are a palladium-coated iridium/palladium alloy wire made radioactive by neutron activation. This wire is then inserted into a tumor such as a breast tumor, and the tumor is irradiated by gamma ray photons from the wire. At the end of the treatment the wire is removed.

A rare but notable gamma source is sodium-24; this has a fairly short half-life of 15 hours, but it emits photons with very high energies (>2 MeV). It could be used for radiography of thick steel objects if the radiography occurred close to the point of production. Similarly to ^{60}Co and ^{192}Ir, it is formed by the neutron activation of the commonly found stable isotope.

== Minor actinides ==
Americium-241 has been used as a source of low energy gamma photons, it has been used in some applications such as portable X-ray fluorescence equipment (XRF) and common household ionizing smoke detectors. Americium-241 is produced from ^{239}Pu in nuclear reactors through multiple neutron captures and subsequent beta decays with the plutonium-239 itself being produced mostly from neutron capture and subsequent beta decays by ^{238}U (99% of natural uranium and usually roughly 97% of low enriched uranium or MOX fuel).

== Natural radioisotopes ==
Many years ago radium-226 and radon-222 were used as gamma-ray sources for industrial radiography: for instance, a radon-222 source was used to examine the mechanisms inside an unexploded V-1 flying bomb, while some of the early Bathyspheres could be examined using radium-226 to check for cracks. Because both radium and radon are very radiotoxic and very expensive due to their natural rarity, these natural radioisotopes have fallen out of use over the last half-century, replaced by artificially created radioisotopes. Radon therapy sits on the edge of radioactive quackery and genuine radiotherapy in part due to the lack of reliable data on the stated health benefits.

== Table of some useful gamma emitting isotopes ==
Useful Gamma emitting isotopes
Isotope	atomic mass	half-life	Emitted Gamma energy (MeV)	Notes
Be-7	7	53 d	0.48	
Na-22	22	2.6 yr	1.28	This isotope also undergoes β^{+} decay, which produces two 0.511 MeV gamma rays at opposite directions via annihilation with electrons, thus making this isotope an indirect source of such gammas.
Na-24	24	15 hr	1.37	
Mn-54	54	312 d	0.84	
Co-57	57	272 d	0.122	
Co-60	60	5.265 yr	1.17	Co-60 emits two distinct gammas of high energy (total energy is 2.5 MeV)
Co-60	60	5.265 yr	1.33	used in industrial radiography
Zn-65	65	244 d	1.115	
Ga-66	66	9.4 hr	1.04	
Tc-99m	99	6 hr	0.14	used in a variety of nuclear medicine imaging procedures
Pd-103	103	17 d	0.021	used in brachytherapy
Ag-112	112	3.13 hr	0.62	
Sn-113	113	115 d	0.392	
Te-132	132	77 hr	0.23	
I-125	125	60 d	0.035	used in brachytherapy
I-131	131	8 d	0.364	used in brachytherapy
Xe-133	133	5.24 d	0.08	
Cs-134	134	2.06 yr	0.61	
Cs-137	137	30.17 yr	0.662	sometimes still used in radiotherapy and industrial application for measuring the density, liquid level, humidity and many more
Ba-133	133	10.5 yr	0.356	
Ce-144	144	285 d	0.13	
Rn-222	222	3.8 d	0.51	
Ra-226	226	1600 yr	0.19	used for early radiotherapy (pre Cs-137 and Co-60 circa 1950's)
Am-241	241	432 yr	0.06	Used in most smoke detectors

Note only half-lives between 100 min and 5,000 yr are listed as short half-lives are usually not practical to use, and long half-lives usually mean extremely low specific activity. d = day, hr = hour, yr = year.

== See also ==
- Isotopes of caesium
- Common beta emitters
- List of alpha-emitting nuclides
