= List of alpha-emitting nuclides =

The following are among the principal radionuclides known to undergo alpha decay, emitting alpha particles.

- ^{209}Bi, ^{211}Bi, ^{212}Bi, ^{213}Bi
- ^{210}Po, ^{211}Po, ^{212}Po, ^{214}Po, ^{215}Po, ^{216}Po, ^{218}Po
- ^{215}At, ^{217}At, ^{218}At
- ^{218}Rn, ^{219}Rn, ^{220}Rn, ^{222}Rn, ^{226}Rn
- ^{221}Fr
- ^{223}Ra, ^{224}Ra, ^{226}Ra
- ^{225}Ac, ^{227}Ac
- ^{227}Th, ^{228}Th, ^{229}Th, ^{230}Th, ^{232}Th
- ^{231}Pa
- ^{233}U, ^{234}U, ^{235}U, ^{236}U, ^{238}U
- ^{237}Np
- ^{238}Pu, ^{239}Pu, ^{240}Pu, ^{244}Pu
- ^{241}Am
- ^{244}Cm, ^{245}Cm, ^{248}Cm
- ^{249}Cf, ^{252}Cf

== See also ==
- Common beta emitters
- Commonly used gamma-emitting isotopes
