= Tritium Systems Test Assembly =

The Tritium Systems Test Assembly (TSTA) was a facility at Los Alamos National Laboratory dedicated to the development and demonstration of technologies required for fusion-relevant deuterium-tritium processing. Facility design was launched in 1977. It was commissioned in 1982, and the first tritium was processed in 1984. The maximum tritium inventory was 140 grams.

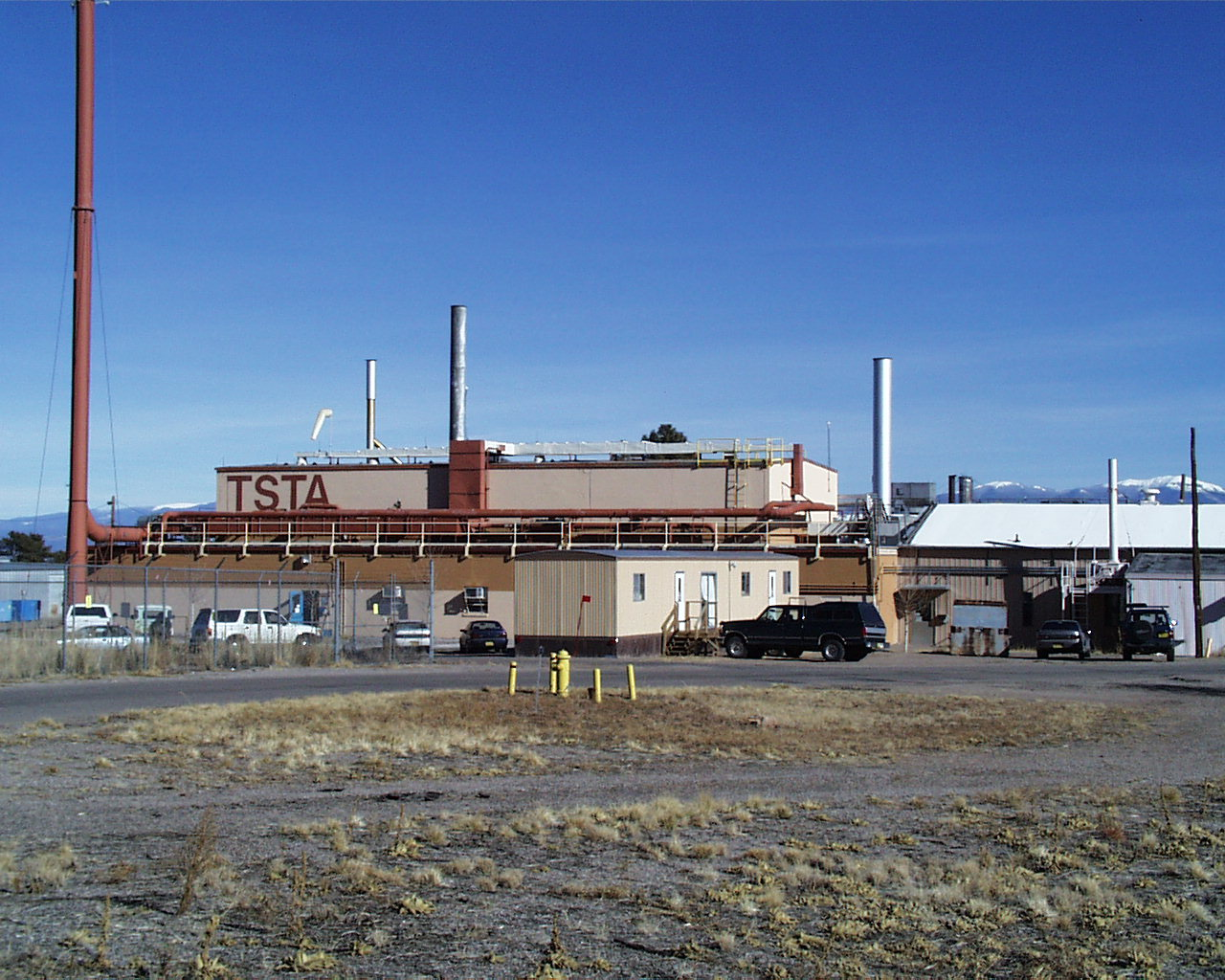
Outside Front View of TSTA

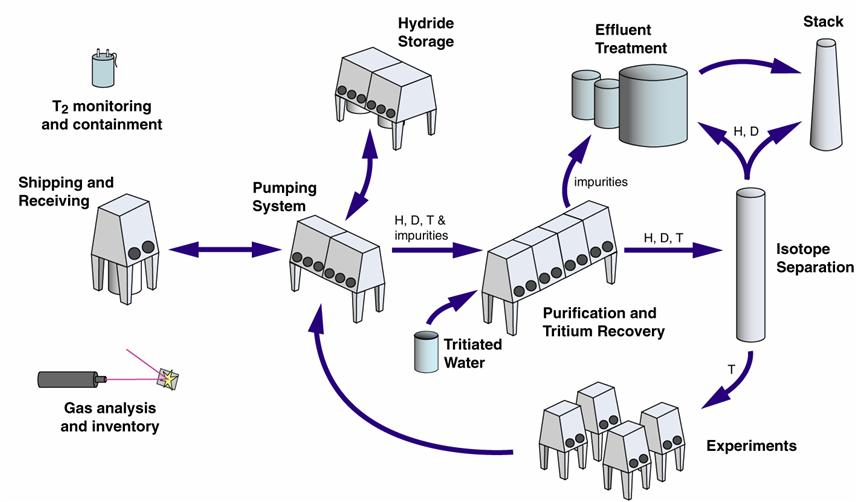
TSTA sub-systems and major flowpaths
