= Atomic battery =

Devices generating electricity from radioisotope decay

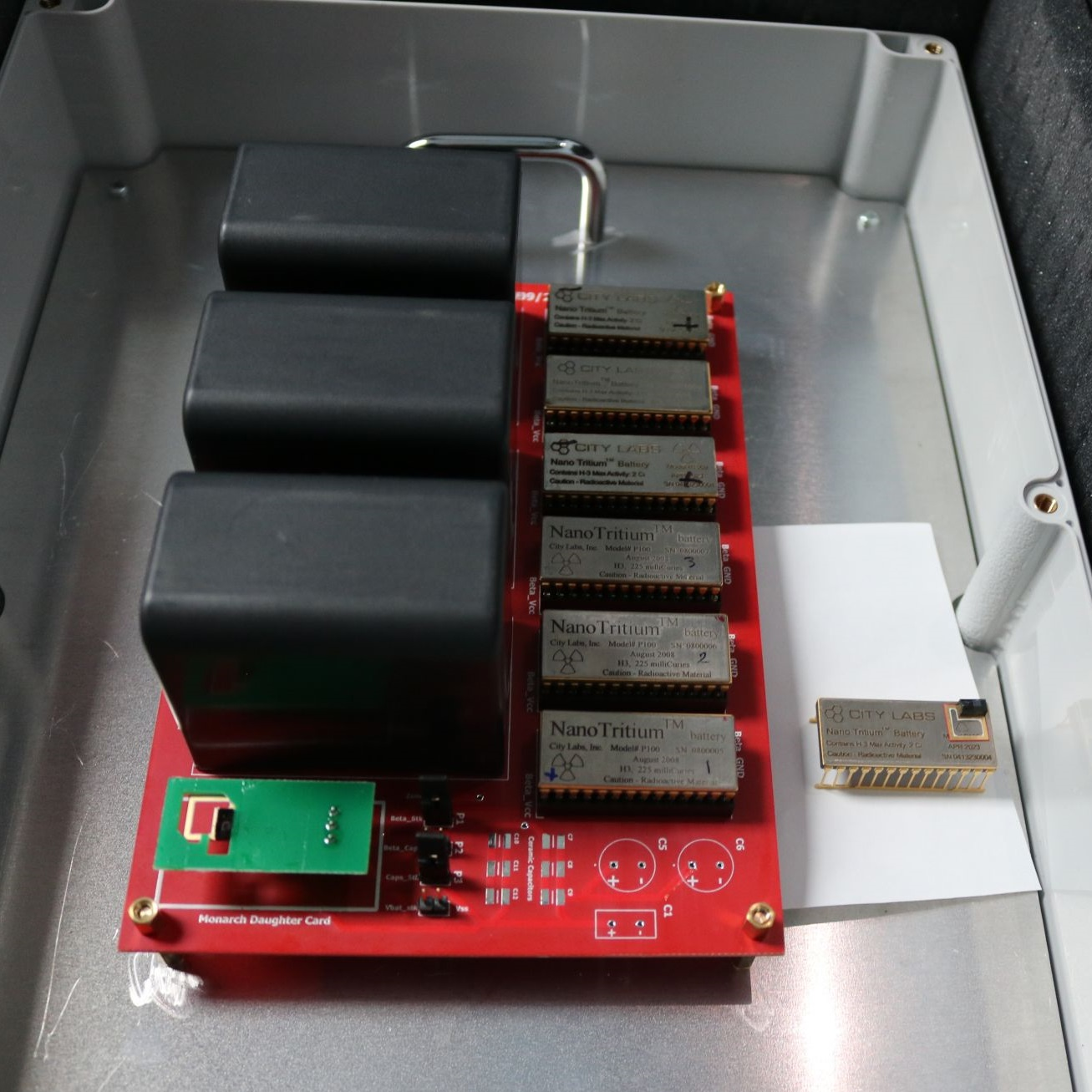
Nanotritium batteries powering circuit board (left) and a Michigan Micro Mote (right), displayed at SpaceCom 2024.

An atomic battery, nuclear battery, radioisotope battery, or radioisotope generator uses energy from the decay of a radioactive isotope to generate electric power. Like a nuclear reactor, it generates electricity from nuclear energy, but it differs by not using a chain reaction. Although commonly called batteries, atomic batteries are technically not electrochemical and cannot be charged or recharged. Although they are very costly, they have extremely long lives and high energy density, so they are typically used as power sources for equipment that must operate unattended for long periods, such as spacecraft, pacemakers, medical devices, underwater systems, and automated scientific stations in remote parts of the world.

Nuclear batteries began in 1913, when Henry Moseley first demonstrated a current generated by charged-particle radiation. Since RCA's initial nuclear research and development in the early 1950s, many types and methods have been designed to extract electrical energy from nuclear sources.

Nuclear batteries can be classified by their means of energy conversion into two main groups: thermal converters and non-thermal converters. The thermal types convert some of the heat generated by the nuclear decay into electricity; an example is the radioisotope thermoelectric generator (RTG), often used in spacecraft. The non-thermal converters, such as betavoltaic cells, extract energy directly from the emitted radiation, before it is degraded into heat; they are easier to miniaturize and do not need a thermal gradient to operate, so they can be used in small machines.

Atomic batteries usually have an efficiency of 0.1–5%. High-efficiency betavoltaic devices can reach 6–8% efficiency.

== History ==
Henri Becquerel's discovery of natural radioactivity (1896), and Marie Curie's discovery of the radioactive elements Polonium and Radium (1898), led to Ernest Rutherford's identification of alpha and beta particles (1898–1902). Rutherford collaborated with Frederick Soddy on further research leading to the discovery of radioactive decay (1902–1903).

Interest in producing atomic batteries began in 1913, when Henry Moseley first demonstrated high voltage of 150kV, with a current equal to 0.01nA, through the release of beta rays from radium and its decay products.

In the 1950s and 1960s, this field of research gained significant attention for applications requiring long life power sources. In 1954, RCA (Radio Corporation of America), created an atomic battery prototype that produced a current equal to 5μA for small radio receivers and hearing aids. A few years after, in 1961, one of the first documented atomic batteries, known as a radioisotope thermoelectric generator (RTG), was used by NASA in space using Plutonium 238 radioisotope as its fuel.

== Thermal conversion ==
=== Thermionic conversion ===
A thermionic converter (TEC) consists of a hot electrode, which thermionically emits electrons over a space-charge barrier to a cooler electrode, producing a useful power output. Caesium vapor is commonly used to optimize the electrode work functions and provide an ion supply (by surface ionization) to neutralize the electron space charge. However, it is still in experimental stage and not fully used for commercial purpose due to low efficiency and power density, low work function, and high temperature enduring material limitations.

=== Thermoelectric conversion ===
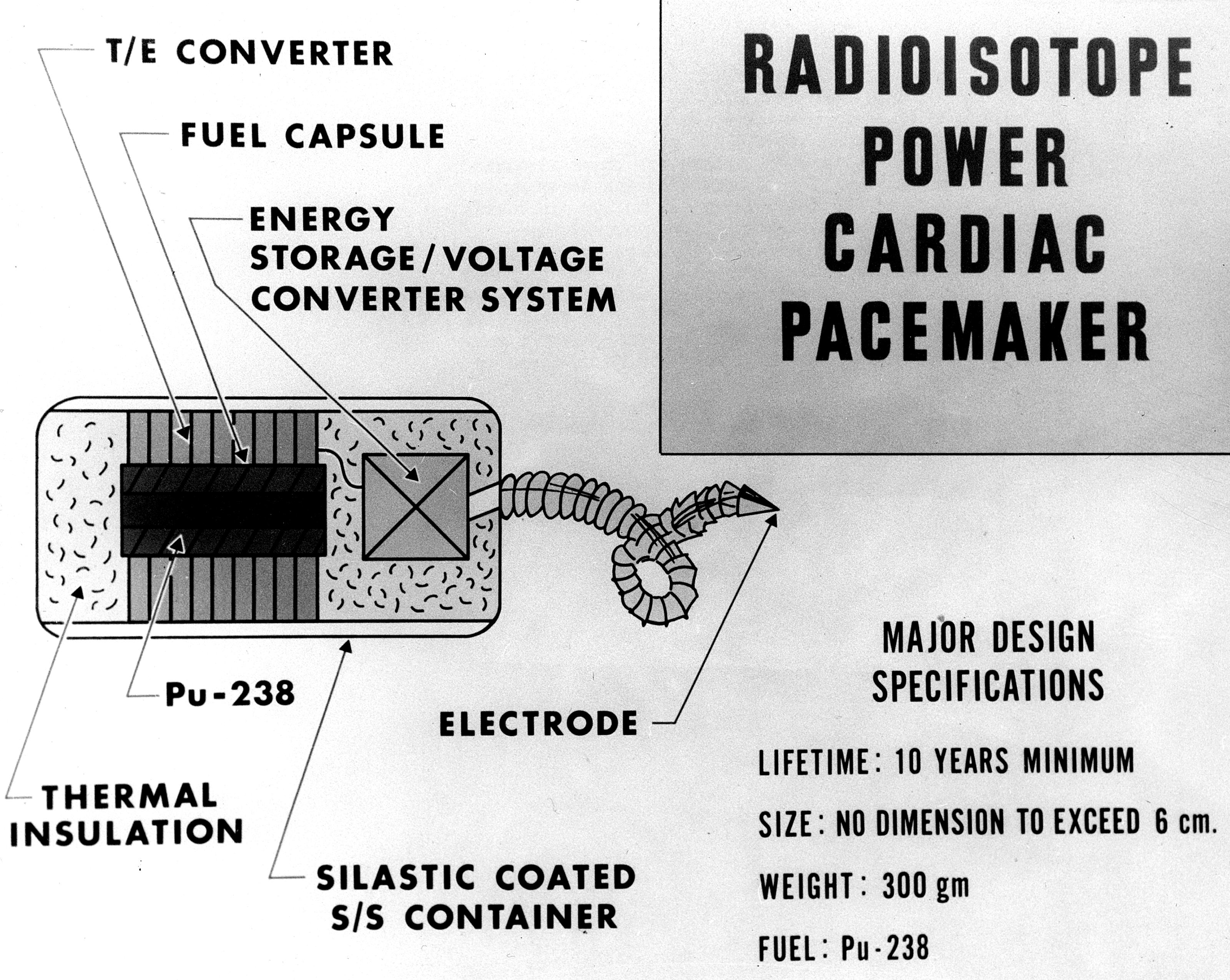
Radioisotope-powered cardiac pacemaker being developed by the Atomic Energy Commission, circa 1967.

A radioisotope thermoelectric generator (RTG) produces electricity through the Seebeck effect using thermocouples. Each thermocouple is formed from two wires of different metals (or other materials). A temperature gradient along the length of each wire produces a voltage gradient from one end of the wire to the other; but the different materials produce different voltages per degree of temperature difference. By connecting the wires at one end, heating that end but cooling the other end, a usable, but small (millivolts), voltage is generated between the unconnected wire ends. In practice, many thermocouples are connected in series (or in parallel) to generate a larger voltage (or current) from the same heat source, while heat flows from the hot ends to the cold ends. Metal thermocouples have low thermal-to-electrical efficiency. However, the carrier density and charge can be adjusted in semiconductor materials such as bismuth telluride and silicon–germanium to achieve much higher conversion efficiencies. Ayodele, Luta, and Kahn mention RTG's wide use as a result of its "absence of toxic residuals, compact, extremely reliable, simple, independent of position, scalable, running silently, and practically maintenance free" (Ayodele, Luta, and Kahn 4422). On the other hand, one of RTG's limitations is its low efficiency. Despite being developed by NASA, it is currently not used for commercial purposes, but rather for space mission and defense projects.

=== Thermophotovoltaic energy conversion ===
Thermophotovoltaic (TPV) cells work by the same principles as a photovoltaic cell, except that they convert infrared light (rather than visible light) emitted by a hot surface, into electricity. However, it is still in experimental stage and not fully used for commercial purpose due to insufficient efficiency and power density, high material cost, and incompatible scalability, longevity, and reliability (Datas et al.)

=== Stirling generators ===
A Stirling radioisotope generator is a Stirling engine driven by the temperature difference produced by a radioisotope. A more efficient version, the advanced Stirling radioisotope generator, was under development by NASA, but was cancelled in 2013 due to large-scale cost overruns.

== Non-thermal conversion ==
Non-thermal converters extract energy from emitted radiation before it is degraded into heat. Unlike thermoelectric and thermionic converters their output does not depend on the temperature difference. Non-thermal generators can be classified by the type of particle used and by the mechanism by which their energy is converted.

=== Electrostatic conversion ===
Energy can be extracted from emitted charged particles when their charge builds up in a conductor, thus creating an electrostatic potential. Without a dissipation mode, the voltage can increase up to the energy of the radiated particles, which may range from several kilovolts (for beta radiation) up to megavolts (alpha radiation). The built up electrostatic energy can be turned into usable electricity in one of the following ways:

==== Direct-charging generator ====
A direct-charging generator consists of a capacitor charged by the current of charged particles from a radioactive layer deposited on one of the electrodes. Spacing can be either vacuum or dielectric. Negatively charged beta particles, positively charged alpha particles, positrons, or fission fragments may be utilized. Although this form of nuclear-electric generator dates back to 1913, few applications have been found for the extremely low currents and inconveniently high voltages provided by direct-charging generators. Oscillator–transformer systems are employed to reduce the voltages, and then rectifiers transform the AC power back to direct current.

English physicist H. G. J. Moseley constructed the first of these. Moseley's apparatus consisted of a glass globe silvered on the inside, with a radium emitter mounted on the tip of a wire at the center. The charged alpha particles from the radium created a flow of electricity as they moved quickly from the radium to the inside surface of the sphere. As late as 1945 the Moseley model guided other efforts to build experimental batteries generating electricity from the emissions of radioactive elements.

==== Electromechanical conversion ====
Electromechanical atomic batteries use the buildup of charge between two plates to pull one bendable plate toward the other, until the two plates touch, discharge, equalizing the electrostatic buildup, and spring back. The mechanical motion produced can be used to produce electricity through flexing of a piezoelectric material or through a linear generator. Milliwatts of power are produced in pulses depending on the charge rate, in some cases multiple times per second (35 Hz).

=== Radiovoltaic conversion ===
A "radiovoltaic" (RV) device converts the energy of ionizing radiation directly into electricity using a semiconductor junction, similar to the conversion of photons into electricity in a photovoltaic cell. Depending on the type of radiation targeted, these devices are called "alphavoltaic" (AV, αV), "betavoltaic" (BV, βV), or "gammavoltaic" (GV, γV). Betavoltaics have traditionally received the most attention since (low-energy) beta emitters cause the least amount of radiative damage, thus allowing a longer operating life and less shielding. Interest in alphavoltaic and (more recently) gammavoltaic devices is driven by their potential higher efficiency.

==== Alphavoltaic conversion ====
Alphavoltaic devices use a semiconductor junction to produce electrical energy from energetic alpha particles.

==== Betavoltaic conversion ====
Betavoltaic devices use a semiconductor junction to produce electrical energy from energetic beta particles (electrons). A commonly used source is the hydrogen isotope tritium, which is employed in City Labs' NanoTritium batteries.

Betavoltaic devices are particularly well-suited to low-power electrical applications where long life of the energy source is needed, such as implantable medical devices or military and space applications.

The Chinese startup Betavolt claimed in January 2024 to have a miniature device in the pilot testing stage. It is said to generate 100 microwatts of power at a voltage of 3V and has a lifetime of 50 years without any need for charging or maintenance. Betavolt claims it to be the first such miniaturised device ever developed. It gains its energy from the isotope nickel-63, held in a module the size of a very small coin. As it is consumed, the nickel-63 decays into stable, non-radioactive isotopes of copper, which pose no environmental threat. It contains a thin wafer of nickel-63 providing beta particle electrons sandwiched between two thin crystallographic diamond semiconductor layers.

==== Gammavoltaic conversion ====
Gammavoltaic devices use a semiconductor junction to produce electrical energy from energetic gamma particles (high-energy photons). They have only been considered in the 2010s but were proposed as early as 1981.

A gammavoltaic effect has been reported in perovskite solar cells. Another patented design involves scattering of the gamma particle until its energy has decreased enough to be absorbed in a conventional photovoltaic cell. Gammavoltaic designs using diamond and Schottky diodes are also being investigated.

=== Radiophotovoltaic (optoelectric) conversion ===
In a radiophotovoltaic (RPV) device the energy conversion is indirect: the emitted particles are first converted into light using a radioluminescent material (a scintillator or phosphor), and the light is then converted into electricity using a photovoltaic cell. Depending on the type of particle targeted, the conversion type can be more precisely specified as alphaphotovoltaic (APV or α-PV), betaphotovoltaic (BPV or β-PV) or gammaphotovoltaic (GPV or γ-PV).

Radiophotovoltaic conversion can be combined with radiovoltaic conversion to increase the conversion efficiency.

== Radioisotopes used ==
Atomic batteries use radioisotopes that produce low-energy beta particles or sometimes alpha particles of varying energies. Low-energy beta particles are needed to prevent the production of high-energy penetrating bremsstrahlung radiation that would require heavy shielding. Radioisotopes such as tritium, nickel-63, promethium-147, and technetium-99 have been tested. Plutonium-238, curium-242, curium-244, and strontium-90 have been used. Besides the nuclear properties of the used isotope, there are also the issues of chemical properties and availability. A product deliberately produced via neutron irradiation or in a particle accelerator is more difficult to obtain than a fission product easily extracted from spent nuclear fuel.

Plutonium-238 must be deliberately produced via neutron irradiation of neptunium-237, but it can be easily converted into a stable plutonium oxide ceramic. Strontium-90 is easily extracted from spent nuclear fuel but must be converted into the perovskite form strontium titanate to reduce its chemical mobility, cutting power density in half. Caesium-137, another high yield nuclear fission product, is rarely used in atomic batteries because it is difficult to convert into chemically inert substances. Another undesirable property of Cs-137 extracted from spent nuclear fuel is that it is contaminated with other isotopes of caesium which reduce power density further.

== Applications ==
=== Pacemakers ===
Medtronic and Alcatel developed a plutonium-powered pacemaker, the Numec NU-5, powered by a 2.5 Ci slug of plutonium 238, first implanted in a human patient in 1970. The 139 Numec NU-5 nuclear pacemakers implanted in the 1970s are expected to never need replacing, an advantage over non-nuclear pacemakers, which require surgical replacement of their batteries every 5 to 10 years. The plutonium "batteries" are expected to produce enough power to drive the circuit for longer than the 88-year halflife of the plutonium-238. The last of these units was implanted in 1988, as lithium-powered pacemakers, which had an expected lifespan of 10 or more years without the disadvantages of radiation concerns and regulatory hurdles, became available.

Betavoltaic batteries are also being considered as long-lasting power sources for lead-free pacemakers.

=== Micro-batteries ===
In the field of microelectromechanical systems (MEMS), nuclear engineers at the University of Wisconsin, Madison have explored the possibilities of producing minuscule batteries which exploit radioactive nuclei of substances such as polonium or curium to produce electric energy. As an example of an integrated, self-powered application, the researchers have created an oscillating cantilever beam that is capable of consistent, periodic oscillations over very long time periods without the need for refueling. Ongoing work demonstrate that this cantilever is capable of radio frequency transmission, allowing MEMS devices to communicate with one another wirelessly.

These micro-batteries are very light and deliver enough energy to function as power supply for use in MEMS devices and further for supply for nanodevices.

The radiation energy released is transformed into electric energy, which is restricted to the area of the device that contains the processor and the micro-battery that supplies it with energy.

== Modern advancements ==
Modern nano-scale technology and new wide-bandgap semiconductors have allowed the making of new devices and interesting material properties not previously available.

== See also ==
- Button cell – Small battery
- Induced gamma emission – Bombarding atomic nuclei to give off very short-wavelength light
- List of battery types
- Nuclear electric rocket – Type of spacecraft propulsion system
- Radioisotope heater unit – Device that provides heat through radioactive decay
- Radioisotope rocket
