= Tritium =

Isotope of hydrogen with two neutrons

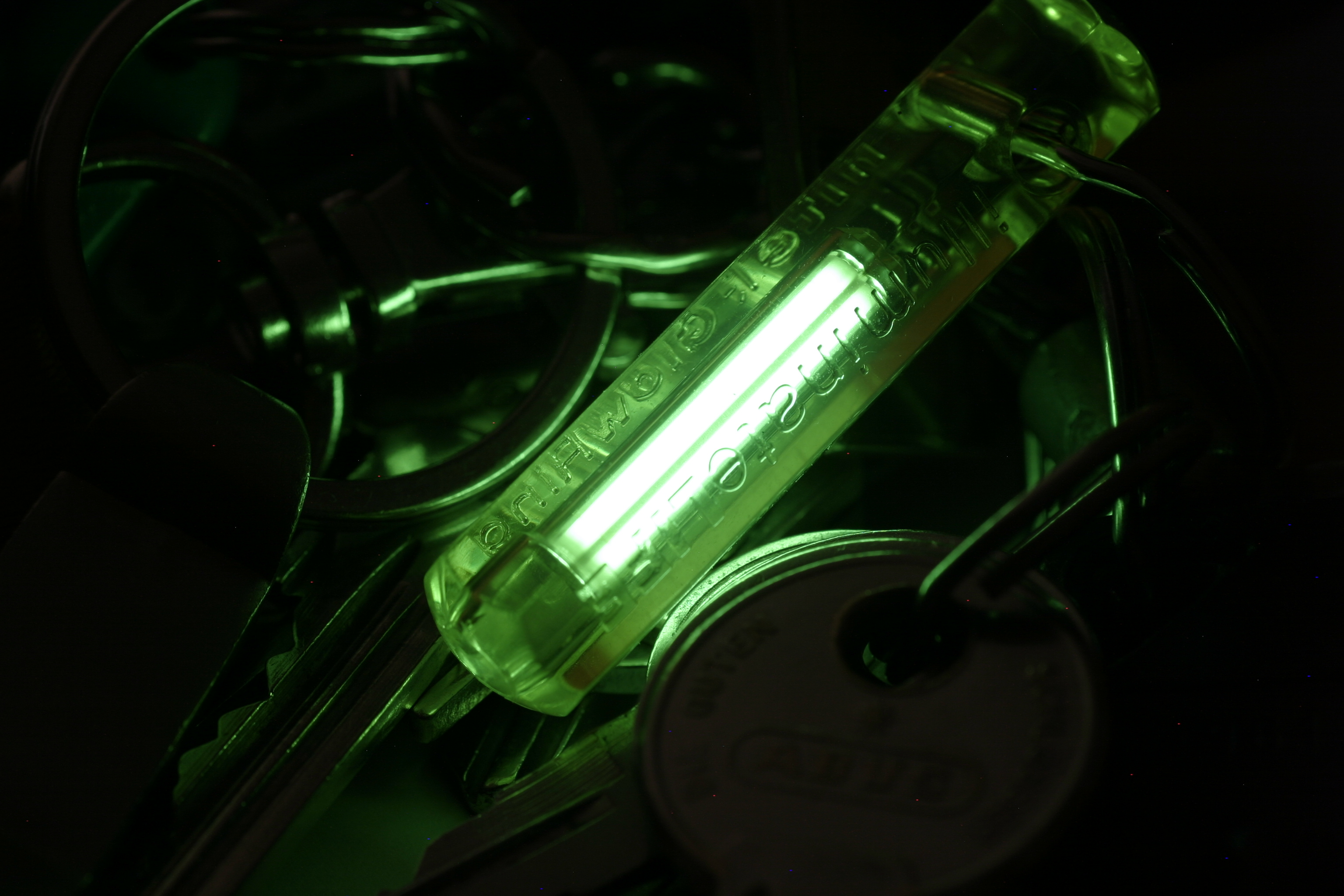

General
- Symbol: ^{3}H
- Names: Tritium, hydrogen-3, T, ^{3}T
- Protons (Z): 1
- Neutrons (N): 2

Nuclide data
- Natural abundance: 10^{−18} in hydrogen
- Half-life (t_{1/2}): 12.32 years
- Isotope mass: 3.01604928 Da
- Spin: 1/2 ħ
- Excess energy: 14949.794±0.001 keV
- Nuclear binding energy: 8481.7963±0.0009 keV
- Decay products: ^{3}He

Decay modes
- Decay mode: Decay energy (MeV)
- Beta emission: 0.018592

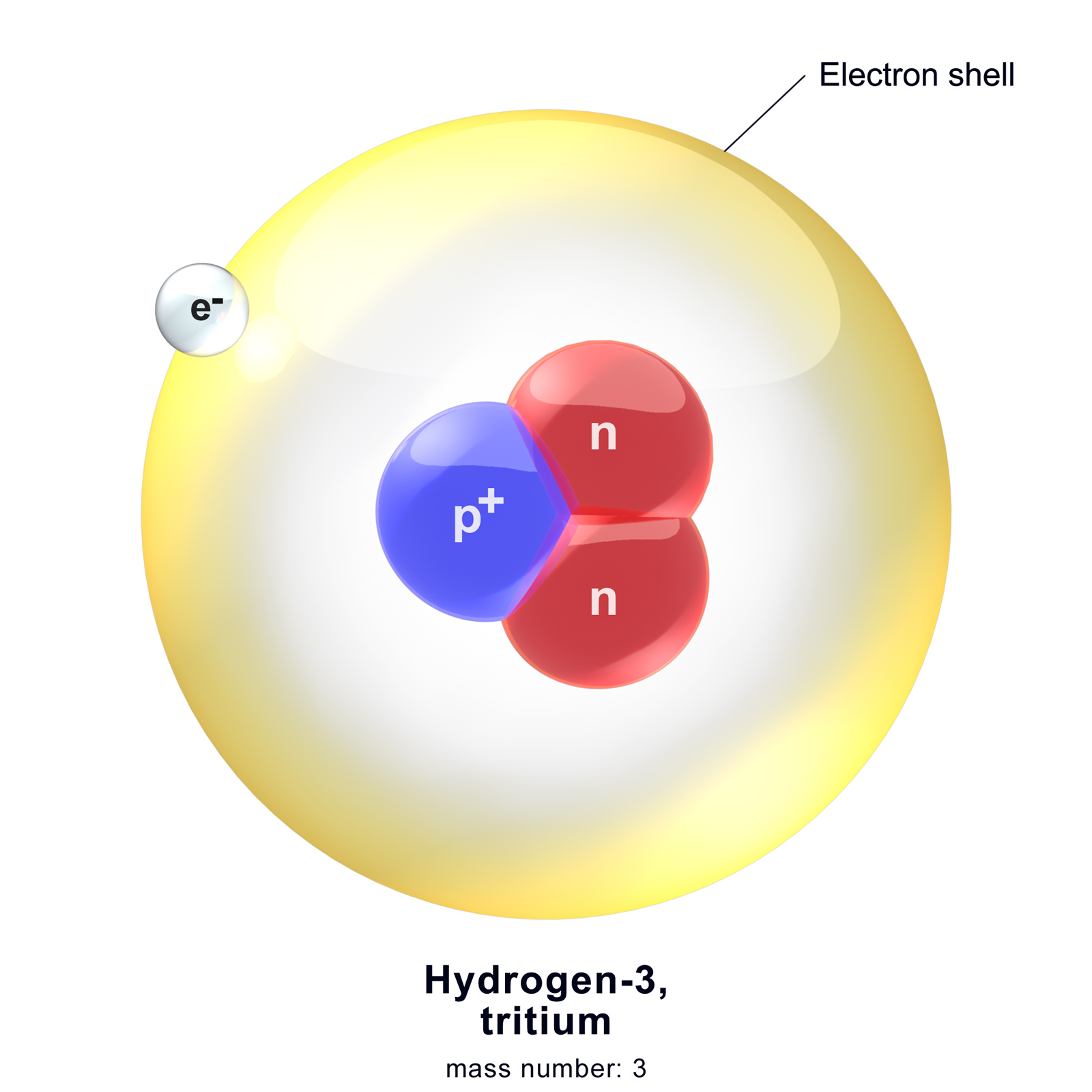
Representative model of a tritium atom

Tritium (from Ancient Greek τρίτος (trítos) 'third'), or hydrogen-3 (symbol T or ^{3}H), is a rare and radioactive isotope of hydrogen with a half-life of 12.32 years. The tritium nucleus (t, sometimes called a triton) contains one proton and two neutrons, whereas the nucleus of the common isotope hydrogen-1 (protium) contains one proton and no neutrons, and that of non-radioactive hydrogen-2 (deuterium) contains one proton and one neutron. Tritium is the heaviest particle-bound isotope of hydrogen. It is one of the few nuclides with a distinct name. The use of the name hydrogen-3, though more systematic, is much less common.

Naturally occurring tritium is extremely rare on Earth. The atmosphere has only trace amounts, formed by the interaction of its gases with cosmic rays. It can be produced artificially by irradiation of lithium or lithium-bearing ceramic pebbles in a nuclear reactor and is a low-abundance byproduct in normal operations of nuclear reactors.

Tritium is used as the energy source in radioluminescent lights for watches, night sights for firearms, numerous instruments and tools, and novelty items such as self-illuminating key chains. It is used in a medical and scientific setting as a radioactive tracer. Tritium is also used as a nuclear fusion fuel, along with more abundant deuterium, in tokamak reactors and is a vital component in hydrogen bombs. Tritium has also been used commercially in betavoltaic devices such as NanoTritium batteries.

== History ==
Tritium was first detected in 1934 by Ernest Rutherford, Mark Oliphant and Paul Harteck after bombarding deuterium with deuterons (deuterium nuclei). Deuterium is another isotope of hydrogen (of mass 2), which occurs naturally with an abundance of 0.015%. Their experiment could not isolate tritium, which was first accomplished in 1939 by Luis Alvarez and Robert Cornog, who also realized tritium's radioactivity. Willard Libby recognized in 1954 that tritium could be used for radiometric dating of water and wine.

== Decay ==
Tritium decays into helium-3 by beta-minus decay as shown in this nuclear equation:

^{3}_{1}H	→	^{3}_{2}He	+	e^{−}	+	ν̅_{e}

releasing 18.6 keV of energy in the process. The electron's kinetic energy varies, with an average of 5.7 keV, while the remaining energy is carried off by the nearly undetectable electron antineutrino. Beta particles from tritium can penetrate only about 6 mm (0.24 in) of air, and they are incapable of passing through the dead outermost layer of human skin. Because of their low energy compared to other beta particles, the amount of bremsstrahlung generated is also lower. The unusually low energy released in the tritium beta decay makes the decay (along with that of rhenium-187) useful for attempts at absolute neutrino mass measurement, none of which has yet succeeded.

The low energy of tritium's radiation makes it difficult to detect tritium-labeled compounds except by using liquid scintillation counting.

== Production ==
=== Lithium ===
Tritium is most often produced in nuclear reactors by neutron activation of lithium-6. The release and diffusion of tritium and helium produced by the fission of lithium can take place within ceramics known as breeder ceramics. Production of tritium from lithium-6 in such breeder ceramics is possible with neutrons of any energy, though the cross section is higher when the incident neutrons have lower energy, reaching more than 900 barns for thermal neutrons. This is an exothermic reaction, yielding 4.8 MeV. In comparison, fusion of deuterium with tritium releases about 17.6 MeV. For applications in proposed fusion energy reactors, such as ITER, pebbles consisting of lithium bearing ceramics including Li_{2}TiO_{3} and Li_{4}SiO_{4}, are being developed for tritium breeding within a helium-cooled pebble bed, also known as a breeder blanket.

^{6}_{3}Li + n → ^{4}_{2}He (2.05 MeV) + ^{3}_{1}H (2.75 MeV)

High-energy neutrons can also produce tritium from lithium-7 in an endothermic reaction, consuming 2.466 MeV. This was discovered when the 1954 Castle Bravo nuclear test produced an unexpectedly high yield. Prior to this test, it was incorrectly assumed that ^{7}_{3}Li would absorb a neutron to become ^{8}_{3}Li, which would beta-decay to ^{8}_{4}Be, which in turn would decay to two ^{4}_{2}He nuclei on a total timeframe much longer than the duration of the explosion.

^{7}_{3}Li + n → ^{4}_{2}He + ^{3}_{1}H + n

The slowed neutrons from this reaction can still react with ^{6}_{3}Li in the first, exothermic reaction; thus lithium can generate more tritium atoms than neutrons absorbed.

=== Boron ===
High-energy neutrons irradiating boron-10, also occasionally produce tritium:

^{10}_{5}B + n → 2 ^{4}_{2}He + ^{3}_{1}H

A more common result of boron-10 neutron capture is ^{7}Li and a single alpha particle.

Especially in pressurized water reactors which only partially thermalize neutrons, the interaction between relatively fast neutrons and the boric acid added as a chemical shim produces small but non-negligible quantities of tritium.

=== Deuterium ===
Tritium is also produced in heavy water-moderated reactors whenever a deuterium nucleus captures a neutron. This reaction has a small absorption cross section, making heavy water a good neutron moderator, and relatively little tritium is produced. Even so, cleaning tritium from the moderator may be desirable after several years to reduce the risk of its escaping to the environment. Ontario Power Generation's "Tritium Removal Facility" is capable of processing up to 2,500 tonnes (2,500 long tons; 2,800 short tons) of heavy water a year, and it separates out about 2.5 kg (5.5 lb) of tritium, making it available for other uses. CANDU reactors typically produce 130 grams (4.6 oz) of tritium per year, which is recovered at the Darlington Tritium Recovery Facility (DTRF) attached to the 3,512 MW_{electric} Darlington Nuclear Generating Station in Ontario. The total production at DTRF between 1989 and 2011 was 42.5 kilograms (94 lb) – with an activity of 409 megacuries (15,100 PBq): an average of about 2 kilograms (4.4 lb) per year.

Deuterium's absorption cross section for thermal neutrons is about 0.52 millibarn, whereas that of oxygen-16 (^{16}O) is about 0.19 millibarn and that of oxygen-17 (^{17}O) is about 240 millibarns. While ^{16}O is by far the most common isotope of oxygen in both natural oxygen and heavy water; depending on the method of isotope separation, heavy water may be slightly richer in ^{17}O and ^{18}O. Due to both neutron capture and (n,α) reactions (the latter of which produce ^{14}C, an undesirable long-lived beta emitter, from ^{17}O) they are net "neutron consumers" and are thus undesirable in a moderator of a natural uranium reactor which needs to keep neutron absorption outside the fuel as low as feasible. Some facilities that remove tritium also remove (or at least reduce the content of) ^{17}O and ^{18}O, which can – at least in principle – be used for isotope labeling.

India, which also has a large fleet of pressurized heavy water reactors (initially CANDU technology but since indigenized and further developed IPHWR technology), also removes at least some of the tritium produced in the moderator/coolant of its reactors but due to the dual use nature of tritium and the Indian nuclear bomb program, less information about this is publicly available than for Canada.

=== Fission ===
Tritium is an uncommon product of the nuclear fission of uranium-235, plutonium-239, and uranium-233, (by ternary fission), with a production of about one atom per 10^{4} fissions, meaning it is produced in all reactors. The release or recovery of tritium needs to be considered in the operation of nuclear reactors, especially in the reprocessing of nuclear fuel and storage of spent nuclear fuel. At some nuclear power plants it is discharged to the atmosphere. Voloxidation is an optional additional step in nuclear reprocessing that removes volatile fission products (such as all isotopes of hydrogen) before an aqueous process begins. This would in principle enable economic recovery of the produced tritium, but even if the tritium is only disposed of and not used, it has the potential to reduce tritium contamination in the water used, reducing radioactivity released when the water is discharged since tritiated water cannot be removed from "ordinary" water except by isotope separation.

Annual discharge of tritium from nuclear facilities
Location	Nuclear facility	Closest waters	Liquid (TBq)	Steam (TBq)	Total (TBq)	Total (mg)	year
United Kingdom	Heysham nuclear power station B	Irish Sea	396	2.1	398	1,115	2019
United Kingdom	Sellafield reprocessing facility	Irish Sea	423	56	479	1,342	2019
Romania	Cernavodă Nuclear Power Plant Unit 1	Black Sea	140	152	292	872	2018
France	La Hague reprocessing plant	English Channel	11,400	60	11,460	32,100	2018
South Korea	Wolseong Nuclear Power Plant	East Sea	107	80.9	188	671	2020
Taiwan	Maanshan Nuclear Power Plant	Luzon Strait	35	9.4	44	123	2015
China	Fuqing Nuclear Power Plant	Taiwan Strait	52	0.8	52	146	2020
China	Sanmen Nuclear Power Station	East China Sea	20	0.4	20	56	2020
Canada	Bruce Nuclear Generating Station A, B	Great Lakes	756	994	1,750	4,901	2018
Canada	Darlington Nuclear Generating Station	Great Lakes	220	210	430	1,204	2018
Canada	Pickering Nuclear Generating Station Units 1-4	Great Lakes	140	300	440	1,232	2015
United States	Diablo Canyon Power Plant Units1, 2	Pacific Ocean	82	2.7	84	235	2019

Given the specific activity of tritium at 9,650 curies per gram (357 TBq/g), one TBq is equivalent to roughly 2.8 mg.

==== Fukushima Daiichi ====
In June 2016 the Tritiated Water Task Force released a report on the status of tritium in tritiated water at Fukushima Daiichi nuclear plant, as part of considering options for final disposal of the stored contaminated cooling water. This identified that the March 2016 holding of tritium on-site was 760 TBq (equivalent to 2.1 g of tritium or 14 mL of pure tritiated water) in a total of 860,000 m^{3} of stored water. This report also identified the reducing concentration of tritium in the water extracted from the buildings etc. for storage, seeing a factor of ten decrease over the five years considered (2011–2016), 3.3 MBq/L to 0.3 MBq/L (after correction for the 5% annual decay of tritium).

According to a report by an expert panel considering the best approach to dealing with this issue, "Tritium could be separated theoretically, but there is no practical separation technology on an industrial scale. Accordingly, a controlled environmental release is said to be the best way to treat low-tritium-concentration water." After a public information campaign sponsored by the Japanese government, the gradual release into the sea of the tritiated water began on 24 August 2023 and is the first of four releases through March 2024. The entire process will take "decades" to complete. China reacted with protest. The IAEA has endorsed the plan. The water released is diluted to reduce the tritium concentration to less than 1500 Bq/L, far below the limit recommended in drinking water by the WHO.

=== Helium-3 ===
Tritium's decay product helium-3 has a very large cross section (5330 barns) for reacting with thermal neutrons, expelling a proton; hence, it is rapidly converted back to tritium in nuclear reactors.

^{3}_{2}He + n → ^{1}_{1}H + ^{3}_{1}H

This could allow tritium to be recycled as it decays, maintaining the desired inventory.

=== Cosmic rays ===
Tritium occurs naturally due to cosmic rays interacting with atmospheric gases. In the most important reaction for natural production, a fast neutron (which must have energy greater than 4.0 MeV) interacts with atmospheric nitrogen:

^{14}_{7}N + n → ^{12}_{6}C + ^{3}_{1}H

Worldwide, the production of tritium from natural sources is about 4 megacuries (148 PBq) per year. The global equilibrium inventory of tritium created by natural sources remains approximately constant at 70 megacuries (2,590 PBq), as a balance between the fixed production rate and nuclear decay. These may be taken as 415 g and 7,250 g respectively.

=== Production history ===
==== USA ====
Tritium for American nuclear weapons was produced in special heavy water reactors at the Savannah River Site until their closures in 1988. With the Strategic Arms Reduction Treaty (START) after the end of the Cold War, the existing supplies were sufficient for the new, smaller number of nuclear weapons for some time.

225 kg (496 lb) of tritium was produced in the United States from 1955 to 1996. (Note: Total U.S. tritium production since 1955 has been about 225 kilograms, an estimated 150 kilograms of which have decayed into helium-3, leaving a current inventory of about 75 kg of tritium. — Zerriffi & Scoville (1996)) Since it continually decays into helium-3, the total amount remaining was about 75 kg (165 lb) at the time of the report, and about 16 kg (35 lb) as of 2023.

Tritium production was resumed with irradiation of rods containing lithium (replacing the usual control rods containing boron, cadmium, or hafnium), at the reactors of the commercial Watts Bar Nuclear Plant from 2003 to 2005 followed by extraction of tritium from the rods at the Tritium Extraction Facility at the Savannah River Site beginning in November 2006. Tritium leakage from the rods during reactor operations limits the number that can be used in any reactor without exceeding the maximum allowed tritium levels in the coolant.

== Properties ==
Tritium has an atomic mass of 3.01604928 Da. Diatomic tritium (T_{2} or ^{3}H_{2}) is a gas at standard temperature and pressure. Combined with oxygen, it forms tritiated water (^{3}H_{2}O).

Compared to hydrogen having its natural composition on Earth, tritium has a higher melting point (20.62 K vs. 13.99 K), a higher boiling point (25.04 K vs. 20.27 K), a higher critical temperature (40.59 K vs. 32.94 K) and a higher critical pressure (1.8317 MPa vs. 1.2858 MPa).

Tritium's specific activity is 9,650 curies per gram (3.57×10^{14} Bq/g).

Tritium figures prominently in studies of nuclear fusion due to its favorable reaction cross section and the large amount of energy (17.6 MeV) produced through its reaction with deuterium:

^{3}_{1}H + ^{2}_{1}H → ^{4}_{2}He + n

All atomic nuclei have a positive charge from their protons, and therefore repel one another because like charges repel (Coulomb's law). However, if the atoms have a high enough temperature and pressure (for example, in the core of the Sun), then their random motions can overcome such repulsion, and they can come close enough for the strong nuclear force to take effect, fusing them into heavier atoms.

A tritium nucleus (triton), containing one proton and two neutrons, has the same charge as any hydrogen nucleus, and it experiences the same electrostatic repulsion when close to another nucleus. However, the neutrons in the triton increase the attractive strong nuclear force when close enough to another nucleus. As a result, tritium can fuse more easily with other light atoms than ordinary hydrogen can.

The same is true, albeit to a lesser extent, of deuterium. This is why brown dwarfs ("failed" stars) cannot fuse normal hydrogen, but they do fuse a small minority of deuterium nuclei.

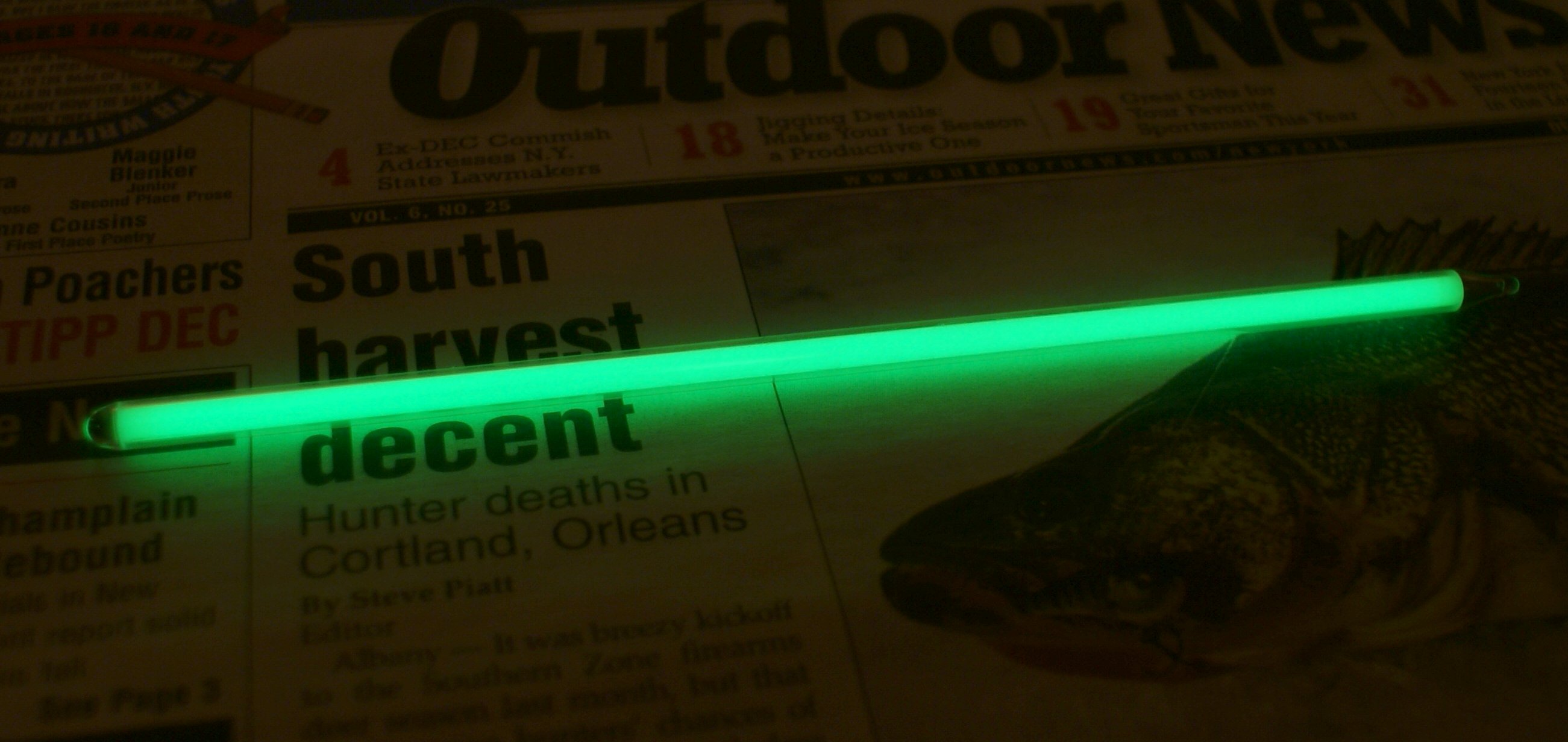
Radioluminescent 1.8 curies (67 GBq) 6 by 0.2 inches (152.4 mm × 5.1 mm) tritium vials are thin, tritium-gas-filled glass vials whose inner surfaces are coated with a phosphor. The vial shown here is brand-new.

Like the other isotopes of hydrogen, tritium is difficult to confine. Rubber, plastic, and some kinds of steel are all somewhat permeable. This has raised concerns that if tritium were used in large quantities, in particular for fusion reactors, it might contribute to radioactive contamination, though its short half-life should prevent significant long-term accumulation in the atmosphere.

The high levels of atmospheric nuclear weapons testing that took place prior to the enactment of the Partial Nuclear Test Ban Treaty proved to be unexpectedly useful to oceanographers. The high levels of tritium oxide introduced into upper layers of the oceans have been used in the years since then to measure the rate of mixing of the upper layers of the oceans with their lower levels.

== Health risks ==
Since tritium is a low energy beta (β) emitter, it is not dangerous externally (its β particles cannot penetrate the skin), but it can be a radiation hazard if inhaled, ingested via food or water, or absorbed through the skin.

Organisms can take up ^{3}_{1}HHO, as they would H_{2}O. Plants convert ^{3}_{1}HHO into organically bound tritium (OBT), and are consumed by animals. ^{3}_{1}HHO is retained in humans for around 12 days, with a small portion of it remaining in the body as OBT. Tritium can be passed along the food chain as one organism feeds on another, though the metabolism of OBT is less understood than that of ^{3}_{1}HHO. Tritium can incorporate to RNA and DNA molecules within organisms which can lead to somatic and genetic impacts. These can emerge in later generations.

^{3}_{1}HHO has a short biological half-life in the human body of 7 to 14 days, which both reduces the total effects of single-incident ingestion and precludes long-term bioaccumulation of ^{3}_{1}HHO from the environment. The biological half-life of tritiated water in the human body, which is a measure of body water turn-over, varies with the season. Studies on the biological half-life of occupational radiation workers for free water tritium in a coastal region of Karnataka, India, show that the biological half-life in winter is twice that of the summer. If tritium exposure is suspected or known, drinking uncontaminated water will help replace the tritium from the body. Increasing sweating, urination or breathing can help the body expel water and thereby the tritium contained in it. However, care should be taken that neither dehydration nor a depletion of the body's electrolytes results, as the health consequences of those things (particularly in the short term) can be more severe than those of tritium exposure.

== Environmental contamination ==
Tritium has leaked from 48 of 65 nuclear sites in the US. In one case, leaking water contained 7.5 microcuries (280 kBq) of tritium per liter, which is 375 times the current EPA limit for drinking water, and 28 times the World Health Organization's recommended limit. This is equivalent to 0.777 nanograms per litre (5.45×10^{−8} gr/imp gal) or roughly 0.8 parts per trillion.

The US Nuclear Regulatory Commission states that in normal operation in 2003, 56 pressurized water reactors released 40,600 curies (1,500,000 GBq) of tritium (maximum: 2,080 Ci (77,000 GBq); minimum: 0.1 Ci (3.7 GBq); average: 725 Ci (26,800 GBq)) and 24 boiling water reactors released 665 Ci (24.6 TBq) (maximum: 174 Ci (6,400 GBq); minimum: 0 Ci; average: 27.7 Ci (1,020 GBq)), in liquid effluents. 40,600 Ci (1,500,000 GBq) of tritium weigh about 4.207 grams (0.1484 oz).

=== Regulatory limits ===
The legal limits for tritium in drinking water vary widely from country to country. Some figures are given below:

Tritium drinking water limits by country
Country	Tritium limit (Bq/L)	Equivalent dose (μSv/year) (Note: Based on ICRP Report 30 calculation: 1.8×10^{−11} Sv/Bq, 730 L/a, 1×10^{6} μSv/Sv; quoted in)
Australia	76,103 (Note: This figure is derived from the guideline dose of 1 mSv per year from all sources of radiation in drinking water in The Australian Drinking Water Guidelines 6, assuming that tritium is the only radionuclide present in the water.)	1,000
Japan	60,000	788.4
Finland	30,000	394.2
World Health Organization	10,000	131.4
Switzerland	10,000	131.4
Russia	7,700	101.18
Canada (Ontario)	7,000	91.98
United States	740	9.72
Norway	100	1.31
Germany	100	1.31

The United States limit results in a dose of 4.0 millirems (or 40 microsieverts in SI units) per year per EPA regulation 40CFR141, and is based on outdated dose calculation standards of National Bureau of Standards Handbook 69 circa 1963. Four millirem per year is about 1.3% of the average natural background radiation (~3 mSv). Updated dose calculation standards based on International Commission on Radiological Protection Report 30 and used in the NRC Regulation 10CFR20 results in a dose of 0.9 millirem (9 μSv) per year at 740 Bq/L (20 nCi/L).

== Use ==
=== Radiometric assays in biology and medicine ===
Partial tritiation of pyridine (C_{5}H_{5}N). The catalyst is not shown.

Tritiation of drug candidates allows detailed analysis of their absorption and metabolism. Tritium has also been used for biological radiometric assays, in a process akin to radiocarbon dating. For example, [^{3}H] retinyl acetate was traced through the bodies of rats.

=== Self-powered lighting ===
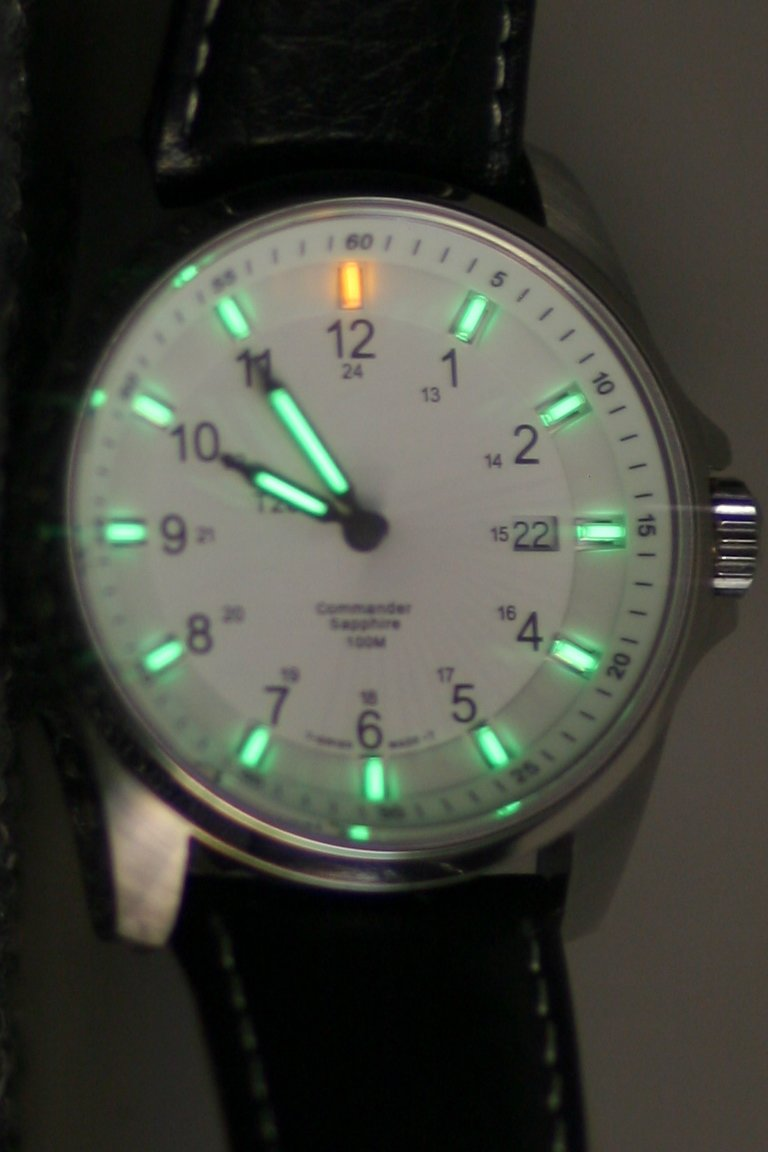
Swiss Military watch with tritium-illuminated face

The beta particles from small amounts of tritium cause chemicals called phosphors to glow. This radioluminescence is used in self-powered lighting devices called betalights, which are used for night illumination of firearm sights, watches, exit signs, map lights, navigational compasses (such as current-use M-1950 U.S. military compasses), knives and a variety of other devices. (Note: Tritium has replaced radioluminescent paint containing radium in this application. Exposure to radium causes bone cancer, and its casual use has been banned in most countries for decades.) As of 2000, commercial demand for tritium is 400 grams (0.88 lb) per year and the cost is $30,000 per gram ($850,000/oz) or more.

=== Nuclear weapons ===
Tritium is an important component in nuclear weapons; it is used to enhance the efficiency and yield of fission bombs and the fission stages of hydrogen bombs in the "boosting" process as well as in external neutron initiators for such weapons.

==== Neutron initiator ====
These are devices incorporated in nuclear weapons which produce a pulse of neutrons when the bomb is detonated to initiate the fission reaction in the fissionable core (pit) of the bomb, after it is compressed to a critical mass by explosives. Actuated by an ultrafast switch like a krytron, a small particle accelerator drives ions of tritium and deuterium to energies above the 15 keV or so needed for deuterium-tritium fusion and directs them into a metal target where the tritium and deuterium are adsorbed as hydrides. High-energy fusion neutrons from the resulting fusion radiate in all directions. Some of these strike plutonium or uranium nuclei in the primary's pit, initiating a nuclear chain reaction. The quantity of neutrons produced is large in absolute numbers, allowing the pit to quickly achieve neutron levels that would otherwise need many more generations of chain reaction, though still small compared to the total number of nuclei in the pit.

==== Boosting ====
Before detonation, a few grams of tritium–deuterium gas are injected into the hollow "pit" of fissile material. The early stages of the fission chain reaction supply enough heat and compression to start deuterium–tritium fusion; then both fission and fusion proceed in parallel, the fission assisting the fusion by continuing heating and compression, and the fusion assisting the fission with highly energetic (14.1 MeV) neutrons. As the fission fuel depletes and also explodes outward, it falls below the density needed to stay critical by itself, but the fusion neutrons make the fission process progress faster and continue longer than it would without boosting. Increased yield comes overwhelmingly from the increased fission. The energy from the fusion itself is much smaller because the amount of fusion fuel is much smaller. Effects of boosting include:

- increased yield (for the same amount of fission fuel, compared to unboosted)
- the possibility of variable yield by varying the amount of fusion fuel
- allowing the bomb to require a smaller amount of the very expensive fissile material
- eliminating the risk of predetonation by nearby nuclear explosions
- not so stringent requirements on the implosion setup, allowing for a smaller and lighter amount of high explosives to be used

The tritium in a warhead is continually undergoing radioactive decay, becoming unavailable for fusion. Also, its decay product, helium-3, absorbs neutrons. This can offset or reverse the intended effect of the tritium, which was to generate many free neutrons, if too much helium-3 has accumulated. Therefore, boosted bombs need fresh tritium periodically. The estimated quantity needed is 4 grams (0.14 oz) per warhead. To maintain constant levels of tritium, about 0.20 grams (0.0071 oz) per warhead per year must be supplied to the bomb.

One mole of deuterium-tritium gas contains about 3.0 grams (0.11 oz) of tritium and 2.0 grams (0.071 oz) of deuterium. In comparison, the 20 moles of plutonium in a nuclear bomb consists of about 4.5 kilograms (9.9 lb) of plutonium-239.

==== Tritium in hydrogen bomb secondaries ====
Since tritium undergoes radioactive decay, and is also difficult to confine physically, the much larger secondary charge of heavy hydrogen isotopes needed in a true hydrogen bomb uses solid lithium deuteride as its source of deuterium and tritium, producing the tritium in situ during secondary ignition.

During the detonation of the primary fission bomb stage in a thermonuclear weapon (Teller–Ulam staging), the sparkplug, a cylinder of ^{235}U/^{239}Pu at the center of the fusion stage(s), begins to fission in a chain reaction, from excess neutrons channeled from the primary. The neutrons released from the fission of the sparkplug split lithium-6 into tritium and helium-4, while lithium-7 is split into helium-4, tritium, and one neutron. As these reactions occur, the fusion stage is compressed by photons from the primary and fission of the ^{238}U or ^{238}U/^{235}U jacket surrounding the fusion stage. Therefore, the fusion stage breeds its own tritium as the device detonates. In the extreme heat and pressure of the explosion, some of the tritium is then forced into fusion with deuterium, and that reaction releases even more neutrons.

Since this fusion process requires an extremely high temperature for ignition, and it produces fewer and less energetic neutrons (only fission and fusion are net neutron producers), lithium deuteride is not used in boosted bombs, but rather for multi-stage hydrogen bombs.

=== Controlled nuclear fusion ===
Tritium is an important fuel for controlled nuclear fusion in both magnetic confinement and inertial confinement fusion reactor designs. The National Ignition Facility (NIF) uses deuterium–tritium fuel, and the experimental fusion reactor ITER will also do so. The deuterium–tritium reaction is favorable since it has the largest fusion cross section (about 5.0 barns) and it reaches this maximum cross section at the lowest energy (about 65 keV center-of-mass) of any potential fusion fuel. As tritium is very rare on earth, concepts for fusion reactors often include the breeding of tritium. During the operation of envisioned breeder fusion reactors, Breeding blankets, often containing lithium as part of ceramic pebbles, are subjected to neutron fluxes to generate tritium to complete the fuel cycle.

The Tritium Systems Test Assembly (TSTA) was a facility at the Los Alamos National Laboratory dedicated to the development and demonstration of technologies required for fusion-relevant deuterium–tritium processing.

=== Electrical power source ===
Tritium can be used in a betavoltaic device to create an atomic battery to generate electricity.

=== Use in electron tubes ===
Tritium is used in various electron tubes, such as the Zellweger ZE22/3 glow tube. These devices contain a small amount of tritium to ionize the fill gas, typically a noble gas like neon or argon. This ionization ensures reliable and consistent operation by providing a steady current when a high voltage is applied, enhancing the device's performance and stability. The tritium is sealed within a glass envelope with two electrodes, one of which is coated with the radioactive material to create an ion path between the electrodes.

== Use as an oceanic transient tracer ==
Aside from chlorofluorocarbons, tritium can act as a transient tracer and can "outline" the biological, chemical, and physical paths throughout the world's oceans because of its evolving distribution. Tritium has thus been used as a tool to examine ocean circulation and ventilation and, for such purposes, is usually measured in tritium units, where 1 TU is defined as 1 tritium atom per 10^{18} hydrogen atoms, equal to about 0.118 Bq/liter. As noted earlier, nuclear tests, mainly in the Northern Hemisphere at high latitudes, throughout the late 1950s and early 1960s introduced lots of tritium into the atmosphere, especially the stratosphere. Before these nuclear tests, there were only about 3-4 kg of tritium on the Earth's surface; but these amounts rose by 2-3 orders of magnitude during the post-test period. Some sources reported natural background levels were exceeded by about 1,000 TU in 1963 and 1964 and the isotope is used in the northern hemisphere to estimate the age of groundwater and construct hydrogeologic simulation models. Estimated atmospheric levels at the height of weapons testing to approach 1,000 TU and pre-fallout levels of rainwater to be between 5 and 10 TU. In 1963 Valentia Island Ireland recorded 2,000 TU in precipitation.

=== North Atlantic Ocean ===
While in the stratosphere (post-test period), the tritium interacted with and oxidized to water molecules and was present in much of the rapidly produced rainfall, making tritium a prognostic tool for studying the evolution and structure of the water cycle as well as the ventilation and formation of water masses in the North Atlantic.

Bomb-tritium data were used from the Transient Tracers in the Ocean (TTO) program in order to quantify the replenishment and overturning rates for deep water located in the North Atlantic.

Bomb-tritium also enters the deep ocean around the Antarctic. Most of the bomb tritiated water (H^{3}HO) throughout the atmosphere can enter the ocean through the following processes:

- precipitation
- vapor exchange
- river runoff

These processes make H^{3}HO a good tracer for time scales of up to a few decades.

Using the data from these processes for 1981, the 1-TU isosurface lies between 500 and 1,000 meters deep in the subtropical regions and then extends to 1,500–2,000 meters south of the Gulf Stream due to recirculation and ventilation in the upper portion of the Atlantic Ocean. To the north, the isosurface deepens and reaches the floor of the abyssal plain which is directly related to the ventilation of the ocean floor over 10–20 year time-scales.

Also evident in the Atlantic Ocean is the tritium profile near Bermuda between the late 1960s and late 1980s. There is a downward propagation of the tritium maximum from the surface (1960s) to 400 meters (1980s), which corresponds to a deepening rate of about 18 meters per year. There are also tritium increases at 1,500 m depth in the late 1970s and 2,500 m in the middle of the 1980s, both of which correspond to cooling events in the deep water and associated deep water ventilation.

From a study in 1991, the tritium profile was used as a tool for studying the mixing and spreading of newly formed North Atlantic Deep Water (NADW), corresponding to tritium increases to 4 TU. This NADW tends to spill over sills that divide the Norwegian Sea from the North Atlantic Ocean and then flows to the west and equatorward in deep boundary currents. This process was explained via the large-scale tritium distribution in the deep North Atlantic between 1981 and 1983. The sub-polar gyre tends to be freshened (ventilated) by the NADW and is directly related to the high tritium values (>1.5 TU). Also evident was the decrease in tritium in the deep western boundary current by a factor of 10 from the Labrador Sea to the Tropics, which is indicative of loss to ocean interior due to turbulent mixing and recirculation.

=== Pacific and Indian oceans ===
In a 1998 study, tritium concentrations in surface seawater and atmospheric water vapor (10 meters above the surface) were sampled at the following locations: the Sulu Sea, Fremantle Bay, the Bay of Bengal, Penang Bay, and the Strait of Malacca. Results indicated that the tritium concentration in surface seawater was highest at the Fremantle Bay (about 0.40 Bq/liter), which could be accredited to the mixing of runoff of freshwater from nearby lands due to large amounts found in coastal waters. Typically, lower concentrations were found between 35 and 45° south, and near the equator. Results also indicated that (in general) tritium has decreased over the years (up to 1997) due to the physical decay of bomb tritium in the Indian Ocean. As for water vapor, the tritium concentration was about one order of magnitude greater than surface seawater concentrations (ranging from 0.46 to 1.15 Bq/L). Therefore, the water vapor tritium is not affected by the surface seawater concentration; thus, the high tritium concentrations in the vapor were concluded to be a direct consequence of the downward movement of natural tritium from the stratosphere to the troposphere (therefore, the ocean air showed a dependence on latitudinal change).

In the North Pacific Ocean, the tritium (introduced as bomb tritium in the Northern Hemisphere) spread in three dimensions. There were subsurface maxima in the middle and low latitude regions, which is indicative of lateral mixing (advection) and diffusion processes along lines of constant potential density (isopycnals) in the upper ocean. Some of these maxima even correlate well with salinity extrema. In order to obtain the structure for ocean circulation, the tritium concentrations were mapped on 3 surfaces of constant potential density (23.90, 26.02, and 26.81). Results indicated that the tritium was well-mixed (at 6 to 7 TU) on the 26.81 isopycnal in the subarctic cyclonic gyre and there appeared to be a slow exchange of tritium (relative to shallower isopycnals) between this gyre and the anticyclonic gyre to the south; also, the tritium on the 23.90 and 26.02 surfaces appeared to be exchanged at a slower rate between the central gyre of the North Pacific and the equatorial regions.

The depth penetration of bomb tritium can be separated into three distinct layers:

Layer 1
Layer 1 is the shallowest layer and includes the deepest, ventilated layer in winter; it has received tritium via radioactive fallout and lost some due to advection and/or vertical diffusion and contains about 28% of the total amount of tritium.
Layer 2
Layer 2 is below the first layer but above the 26.81 isopycnal and is no longer part of the mixed layer. Its two sources are diffusion downward from the mixed layer and lateral expansions outcropping strata (poleward); it contains about 58% of the total tritium.
Layer 3
Layer 3 is representative of waters that are deeper than the outcrop isopycnal and can only receive tritium via vertical diffusion; it contains the remaining 14% of the total tritium.

=== Mississippi River system ===
Trace amounts of radioactive materials from atomic weapons testing settled throughout the Mississippi River System. Tritium concentrations have been used to understand the residence times of continental hydrologic systems such as lakes, streams, and rivers. In a 2004 study, several rivers were taken into account during the examination of tritium concentrations (starting in the 1960s) throughout the Mississippi River Basin: Ohio River (largest input to the Mississippi River flow), Missouri River, and Arkansas River. The highest tritium concentrations were found in 1963 across locations throughout these rivers. The peak correlates with implementation of the US & Soviet atmospheric test ban treaty in 1962. The overall highest concentrations occurred in the Missouri River (1963) and were greater than 1,200 TU while the lowest concentrations were found in the Arkansas River (never greater than 850 TU and less than 10 TU in the mid-1980s).

As for the mass flux of tritium through the main stem of the Mississippi River into the Gulf of Mexico, data indicated that approximately 780 grams of tritium has flowed out of the River and into the Gulf between 1961 and 1997, an average of 21.7 grams/yr and 7.7 PBq/yr. Current fluxes through the Mississippi River are 1 to 2 grams per year as opposed to the pre-bomb period fluxes of roughly 0.4 grams per year.

== See also ==
- Hypertriton
- List of elements facing shortage

== Footnotes ==
Lighter: deuterium	Tritium is an isotope of hydrogen	Heavier: hydrogen-4
Decay product of: hydrogen-4	Decay chain of tritium	Decays to: helium-3
