= Actinium-225 =

Isotope of actinium

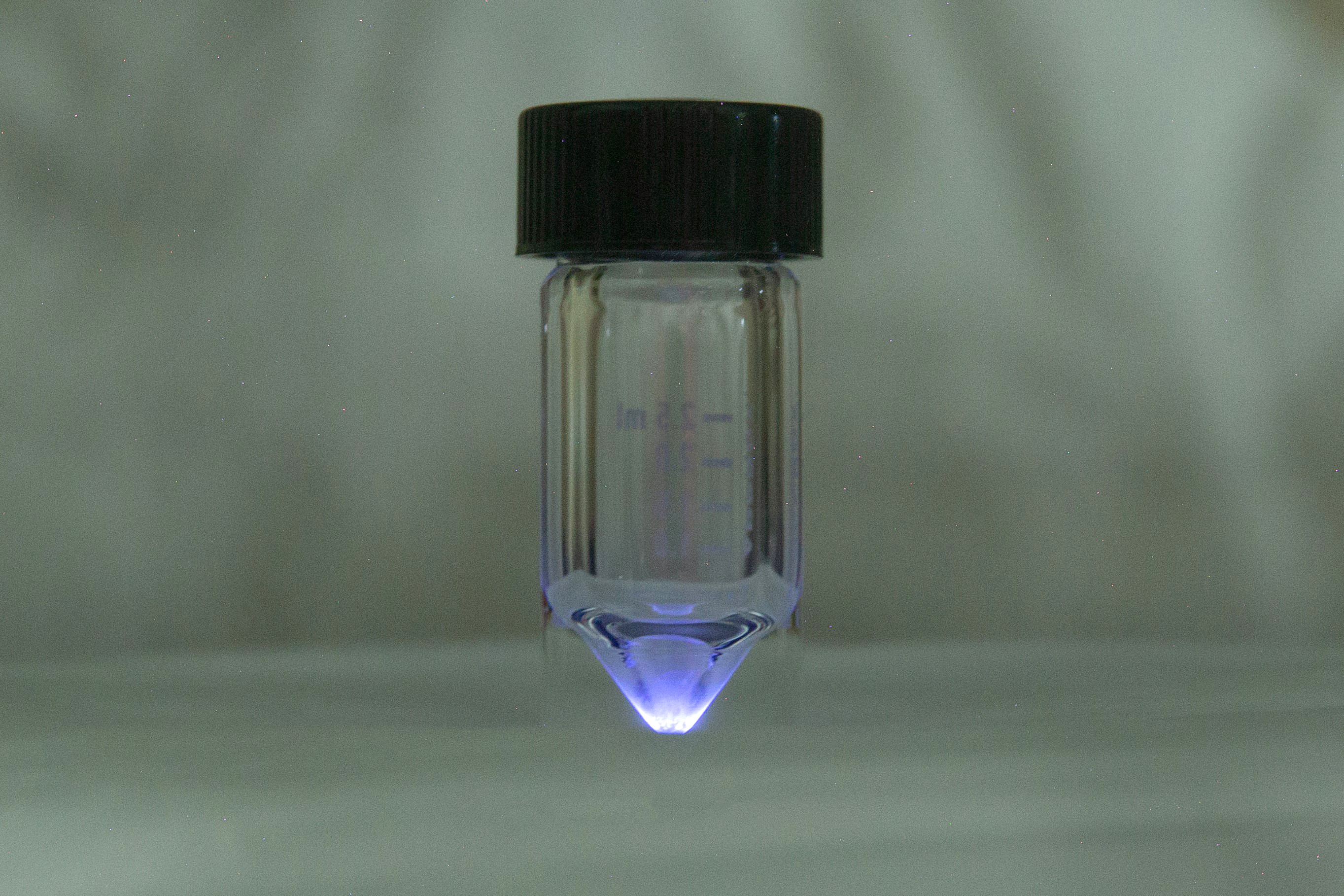
- Cherenkov radiation from a sample of Ac-225 (17 mCi)

General
- Symbol: ^{225}Ac
- Names: actinium-225
- Protons (Z): 89
- Neutrons (N): 136

Nuclide data
- Natural abundance: trace
- Half-life (t_{1/2}): 9.919 d
- Isotope mass: 225.023229 Da
- Excess energy: 21637±5 keV
- Parent isotopes: ^{225}Ra (β^{−})^{229}Pa (α)^{225}Th (EC)
- Decay products: ^{221}Fr

Decay modes
- Decay mode: Decay energy (MeV)
- α: 5.935

Actinium-225 (^{225}Ac, Ac-225) is an isotope of actinium. It undergoes alpha decay to francium-221 with a half-life near 10 days, and is an intermediate decay product in the neptunium series (the decay chain starting at ^{237}Np). Except for minuscule quantities arising from this decay chain in nature, ^{225}Ac is entirely synthetic.

The decay properties of actinium-225 (emitting four alpha particles within about an hour) are favorable for usage in targeted alpha therapy (TAT); clinical trials have demonstrated the applicability of radiopharmaceuticals containing ^{225}Ac to treat various types of cancer. However, the scarcity of this isotope resulting from its necessary synthesis in cyclotrons limits its potential applications. Another such isotope, bismuth-213, is produced necessarily (given its short half-life) from the decay of actinium-225 in a generator and immediate use; it gives only the last of the four alpha particles, requiring a larger amount of actinium, but may be preferred if available.

== Decay and occurrence ==
Actinium-225 is part of the 4n +1 chain (the neptunium series).

Actinium-225 decays exclusively by alpha emission. It is part of the neptunium series, for it arises as a decay product of neptunium-237 and its daughters such as uranium-233 and thorium-229. It is the last nuclide in the chain with a half-life over a day until the penultimate product, bismuth-209 (half-life 2.01×10^{19} years). The final decay product of ^{225}Ac is stable ^{205}Tl.

As a member of the neptunium series, it does not occur in nature except as a product of trace quantities of ^{237}Np and its daughters formed by neutron capture reactions on primordial ^{232}Th and (n,2n) reactions on ^{238}U. It is much rarer than ^{227}Ac and ^{228}Ac, which respectively occur in the decay chains of uranium-235 and thorium-232. Its abundance was estimated as less than 1.1×10^{−19} relative to ^{232}Th and around 9.9×10^{−16} relative to ^{230}Th in secular equilibrium.

== Discovery ==
Actinium-225 was discovered in 1947 as part of the hitherto unknown neptunium series, which was populated by the synthesis of ^{233}U. A team of physicists from Argonne National Laboratory led by F. Hagemann initially reported the discovery of ^{225}Ac and identified its 10-day half-life. Independently, a Canadian group led by A. C. English identified the same decay scheme; both papers were published in the same issue of Physical Review.

== Production ==
As ^{225}Ac does not occur in any appreciable quantities in nature, it must be synthesized in specialized nuclear reactors or accelerators. The majority of ^{225}Ac results from the alpha decay of ^{229}Th, but this supply is limited because the decay of ^{229}Th (half-life 7920 years) is slow. It is also possible to breed ^{225}Ac from radium-226 in the ^{226}Ra(p,2n) reaction. This was first done in 2005, though the production and handling of ^{226}Ra are difficult because of the respective cost of extraction and hazards of decay products such as radon-222. Alternatively, ^{225}Ac can be produced in spallation reactions on a ^{232}Th target irradiated with high-energy proton beams. Current techniques enable the production of millicurie quantities of ^{225}Ac; however, it must then be separated from other reaction products. This is done by allowing some of the shorter-lived nuclides to decay; actinium isotopes are then chemically purified in hot cells and ^{225}Ac is concentrated. Special care must be taken to avoid contamination with the longer-lived beta-emitting actinium-227.

For decades, most ^{225}Ac was produced in one facility—the Oak Ridge National Laboratory in Tennessee—further reducing this isotope's availability even with smaller contributions from other laboratories. Additional ^{225}Ac is now produced from ^{232}Th at Los Alamos National Laboratory and Brookhaven National Laboratory. The TRIUMF facility and Canadian Nuclear Laboratories have formed a strategic partnership around the commercial production of actinium-225.

The limited supply of ^{225}Ac limits its use in research and cancer treatment. It is estimated that the current supply of ^{225}Ac only allows about a thousand cancer treatments per year.

== Applications ==
Alpha emitters such as actinium-225 are favored in cancer treatment because of the short range (a few cell diameters) of alpha particles in tissue and their high energy, rendering them highly effective in targeting and killing cancer cells—specifically, alpha particles are more effective at breaking DNA strands. The 10-day half-life of ^{225}Ac is long enough to facilitate distribution, but short enough that little remains in the body months after treatment. Additionally, each decay of ^{225}Ac to ^{209}Bi nets four high-energy alpha particles, greatly increasing its potency.

Despite its limited availability, several clinical trials have been completed, demonstrating the effectiveness of ^{225}Ac in targeted alpha therapy. Complexes including ^{225}Ac—such as antibodies labeled with ^{225}Ac—have been tested to target various types of cancer, including leukemia, prostate carcinoma, and breast carcinoma in humans. For example, one experimental ^{225}Ac-based drug has shown effectiveness against acute myeloid leukemia without harming the patient. Further clinical trials of other drugs are underway.
