= Radionuclide therapy =

Type of radiation therapy

- ICD-9-CM: 92.28

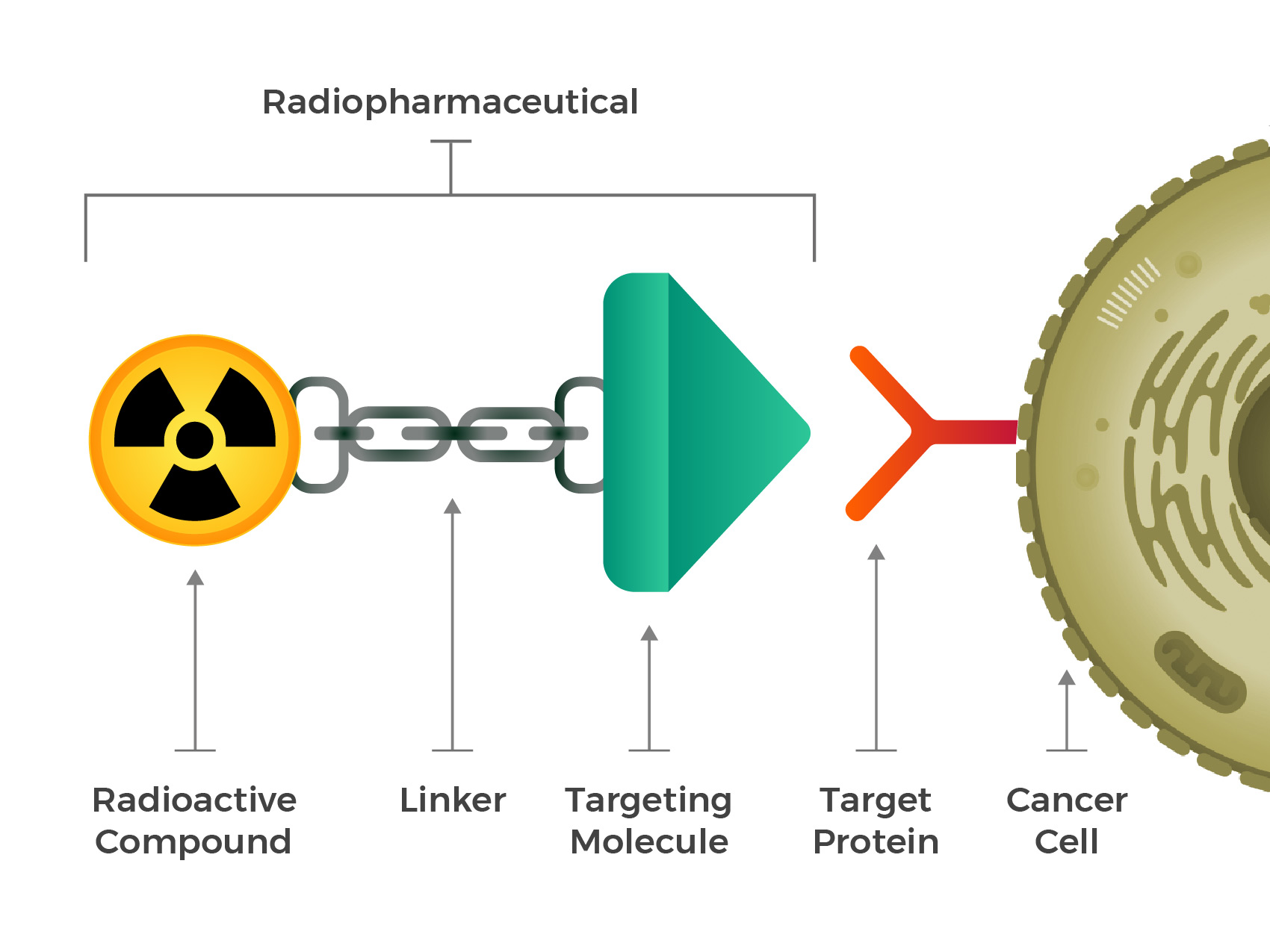
Components of targeted radionuclide therapy

Radionuclide therapy (RNT, also known as unsealed source radiotherapy or molecular radiotherapy) uses radioactive substances called radiopharmaceuticals to treat medical conditions, particularly cancer. These are introduced into the body by various means (injection or ingestion are the two most commonplace) and localise to specific locations, organs or tissues depending on their properties and administration routes. This includes anything from a simple compound such as sodium iodide that locates to the thyroid via trapping the iodide ion, to complex biopharmaceuticals such as recombinant antibodies which are attached to radionuclides and seek out specific antigens on cell surfaces.

This is a type of targeted therapy which uses the physical, chemical and biological properties of the radiopharmaceutical to target areas of the body for radiation treatment. The related diagnostic modality of nuclear medicine employs the same principles but uses different types or quantities of radiopharmaceuticals in order to image or analyse functional systems within the patient. The mechanism of action of radionuclide therapy is the delivery of ioninzing radiation to the target tissue, inducing cellular oxidative stress and DNA damage, resulting in cell death. The choice of the radionuclide depends on its emission pattern (which determine its use in therapy and/or diagnosis), its physical half-life, and the pharmakokinetics of the targeting probe. Radionuclides employed for therapeutic purposes range from β-particle emitters to α-particle emitters.

β-particle emitters release low-energy electrons with a long tissue range of up to 12 mm, which allow them be used to treat larger tumors. These are the most employed radionuclides given their availability and in some cases, the co-emission of γ-radiation photons which enables imaging using SPECT/CT imaging. β-emitters commonly used in oncology include Lutetium-177, yttrium-90 or Iodine-131. Lutetium-177 combines therapeutic electron emissions with γ-radiation emission compatible with SPECT/CT imaging cameras, integrating therapy and diagnostics in the same targeting probe (Theranostics) when using the same radionuclide. Some other β-emitters co-emit internal conversion and Auger electrons, such as Terbium-161, which delivers additional ionization at shorter distances (under 500 nm). α-particle emitters on the other hand, release heavy particles with a short tissue range of up to 100 μm, depositing high-energy radiation. The deposited energy per length of α-particle emitters is 400 times larger than β-particle emitters, which yields more effective DNA damage, with irreparable double-strand DNA breaks. α-emitters like Actinium-225, Lead-212, Astatine-211 or Thorium-227 have gained attention for clinical implementation in recent years due to their emission properties. Radionuclides with such short distance emissions have been shown to be effective mainly in treating micrometastasis.

RNT contrasts with sealed-source therapy (brachytherapy) where the radionuclide remains in a capsule or metal wire during treatment and needs to be physically placed precisely at the treatment position.

When the radionuclides are ligands (such as with Lutathera and Pluvicto), the technique is also known as radioligand therapy.

== Clinical use ==
=== Thyroid conditions ===
Iodine-131 (^{131}I) is the most common RNT worldwide and uses the simple compound sodium iodide with a radioactive isotope of iodine. The patient (human or animal) may ingest an oral solid or liquid amount or receive an intravenous injection of a solution of the compound. The iodide ion is selectively taken up by the thyroid gland. Both benign conditions like thyrotoxicosis and certain malignant conditions like papillary thyroid cancer can be treated with the radiation emitted by radioiodine. Iodine-131 produces beta and gamma radiation. The beta radiation released damages both normal thyroid tissue and any thyroid cancer that behaves like normal thyroid in taking up iodine, so providing the therapeutic effect, whilst most of the gamma radiation escapes the patient's body.

Most of the iodine not taken up by thyroid tissue is excreted through the kidneys into the urine. After radioiodine treatment the urine will be radioactive or 'hot', and the patients themselves will also emit gamma radiation. Depending on the amount of radioactivity administered, it can take several days for the radioactivity to reduce to the point where the patient does not pose a radiation hazard to bystanders. Patients are often treated as inpatients and there are international guidelines, as well as legislation in many countries, which govern the point at which they may return home.

=== Bone metastasis ===
Radium-223 chloride, strontium-89 chloride and samarium-153 EDTMP are used to treat secondary cancer in the bones. Radium and strontium mimic calcium in the body. Samarium is bound to tetraphosphate EDTMP, phosphates are taken up by osteoblastic (bone forming) repairs that occur adjacent to some metastatic lesions.

=== Bone marrow conditions ===
Beta emitting phosphorus-32 (^{32}P), as sodium phosphate, is used to treat overactive bone marrow, in which it is otherwise naturally metabolised.

=== Joint inflammation ===
==== Yttrium-90 colloid ====
An yttrium-90 (^{90}Y) colloidal suspension is used for radiosynovectomy in the knee joint.

=== Liver tumours ===
==== Yttrium-90 spheres ====
^{90}Y in the form of a resin or glass spheres can be used to treat primary and metastatic liver cancers.

=== Neuroendocrine tumours ===
==== Iodine-131 mIBG ====
^{131}I-mIBG (metaiodobenzylguanidine) is used for the treatment of phaeochromocytoma and neuroblastoma.

==== Lutetium-177 ====
Lutetium-177 ( ^{177}Lu) is bound with a DOTA chelator to target neuroendocrine tumours.

== Experimental antibody based methods ==
At the Institute for Transuranium Elements (ITU) work is being done on alpha-immunotherapy, this is an experimental method where antibodies bearing alpha isotopes are used. Bismuth-213 is one of the isotopes which has been used. This is made by the alpha decay of actinium-225. The generation of one short-lived isotope from longer lived isotope is a useful method of providing a portable supply of a short-lived isotope. This is similar to the generation of technetium-99m by a technetium generator. The actinium-225 is made by the irradiation of radium-226 with a cyclotron.
