= Polonium-210 =

Isotope of polonium

General
- Symbol: ^{210}Po
- Names: polonium-210, radium F
- Protons (Z): 84
- Neutrons (N): 126

Nuclide data
- Natural abundance: Trace
- Half-life (t_{1/2}): 138.376±0.002 d
- Isotope mass: 209.9828736 Da
- Spin: 0
- Parent isotopes: ^{210}Bi (β^{−})
- Decay products: ^{206}Pb

Decay modes
- Decay mode: Decay energy (MeV)
- Alpha decay: 5.40745

Polonium-210 (^{210}Po, Po-210, historically radium F) is an isotope of polonium. It undergoes alpha decay to stable ^{206}Pb with a half-life of 138.376 days (about 4 1/2 months), the longest half-life of all naturally occurring polonium isotopes (^{210–218}Po). First identified in 1898, and also marking the discovery of the element polonium, ^{210}Po is generated in the decay chain of uranium-238 and radium-226. ^{210}Po is a prominent contaminant in the environment, mostly affecting seafood and tobacco. Its extreme toxicity is attributed to intense radioactivity, mostly due to alpha particles, which easily cause radiation damage, including cancer in surrounding tissue. The specific activity of ^{210}Po is 166 TBq/g, i.e., 1.66×10^{14} Bq/g. At the same time, ^{210}Po is not readily detected by common radiation detectors, because its gamma rays have a very low intensity. Therefore, ^{210}Po can be considered as a quasi-pure alpha emitter.

== History ==
The decay chain of uranium-238, known as the uranium series or radium series, of which polonium-210 is a member

In 1898, Marie and Pierre Curie discovered a strongly radioactive substance in pitchblende and determined that it was a new element; it was one of the first radioactive elements discovered. Having identified it as such, they named the element polonium after Marie's home country, Poland. Willy Marckwald discovered a similar radioactive activity in 1902 and named it radio-tellurium as it was chemically extracted with its homolog tellurium, and at roughly the same time, Ernest Rutherford identified the same activity in his analysis of the uranium decay chain and named it radium F (originally radium E). By 1905, Rutherford concluded that all these observations were due to the same substance, ^{210}Po. Further discoveries and the concept of isotopes, first proposed in 1913 by Frederick Soddy, firmly placed ^{210}Po as the penultimate step in the uranium series.

In 1943, ^{210}Po was studied as a possible neutron initiator in nuclear weapons, as part of the Dayton Project. In subsequent decades, concerns for the safety of workers handling ^{210}Po led to extensive studies on its health effects.

In the 1950s, scientists of the United States Atomic Energy Commission at Mound Laboratories, Ohio explored the possibility of using ^{210}Po in radioisotope thermoelectric generators (RTGs) as a heat source to power satellites. A 2.5-watt atomic battery using ^{210}Po was developed by 1958. However, the isotope plutonium-238 was chosen instead, as it has a longer half-life of 87.7 years.

Polonium-210 was used to kill Russian dissident and ex-FSB officer Alexander V. Litvinenko in 2006, and was suspected as a possible cause of Yasser Arafat's death, following exhumation and analysis of his corpse in 2012–2013. The radioisotope may also have been used to kill Yuri Shchekochikhin, Lecha Islamov and Roman Tsepov.

== Decay properties ==
Schematic of the final steps of the s-process. The red path represents the sequence of neutron captures; blue and cyan arrows represent beta decay, and the green arrow represents the alpha decay of ^{210}Po. It is the short half-lives of ^{210}Bi and ^{210}Po that prevent the formation of heavier elements, instead resulting in a cycle of four neutron captures, two beta decays, and an alpha decay.

^{210}Po is an alpha emitter that has a half-life of 138.376 days; it decays directly to stable ^{206}Pb. The majority of the time, ^{210}Po decays by emission of an alpha particle only, not by emission of an alpha particle and a gamma ray; about one in 100,000 decays results in the emission of a gamma ray.

$$\mathrm{ ^{210}_{\ 84}Po\ \xrightarrow [138.376 \ d]{}\ ^{206}_{\ 82}Pb\ + ^{\ 4}_{\ 2}He }$$

This low gamma ray production rate makes it difficult to use for identification of the isotope; rather than gamma ray spectroscopy, alpha spectroscopy is the best method of measuring it.

Owing to its much shorter half-life, a milligram of ^{210}Po emits as many alpha particles per second as 5 grams of ^{226}Ra (that is, a milligram is 5 curies). A few curies of ^{210}Po emit a blue glow caused by excitation of surrounding air.

^{210}Po occurs in minute amounts in nature, where it is the penultimate isotope in the uranium series decay chain. It is generated via beta decay from ^{210}Pb and ^{210}Bi.

The astrophysical s-process is terminated by the decay of ^{210}Po, as the neutron flux is insufficient to lead to further neutron captures in the short lifetime of ^{210}Po. Instead, ^{210}Po alpha decays to ^{206}Pb, which then captures more neutrons to become ^{210}Po and repeats the cycle, thus consuming the remaining neutrons. This results in a buildup of lead and bismuth, and ensures that heavier elements such as thorium and uranium are only produced in the much faster r-process.

== Production ==
=== Deliberate ===
Although ^{210}Po occurs in trace amounts in nature, it is not abundant enough (0.1 ppb) for extraction from uranium ore to be feasible. Instead, most ^{210}Po is produced synthetically, through neutron bombardment of ^{209}Bi in a nuclear reactor. This process converts ^{209}Bi to ^{210}Bi, which has a half-life of five days and beta decays to ^{210}Po. Through this method, it was reported in February 2007 that approximately 8 grams (0.28 oz) of ^{210}Po was produced in Russia and shipped to the United States every month for commercial applications.

=== Byproduct ===
The production of polonium-210 is a downside to reactors cooled with lead-bismuth eutectic rather than pure lead. However, given the eutectic properties of this alloy, some proposed Generation IV reactor designs still rely on lead-bismuth.

== Applications ==
A single gram of ^{210}Po generates 140 watts of power (as heat). Because it emits many alpha particles, which are stopped within a very short distance in dense media and release their energy, ^{210}Po has been used as a lightweight heat source to power thermoelectric cells in artificial satellites. A ^{210}Po heat source was also in each of the Lunokhod rovers deployed on the surface of the Moon, to keep their internal components warm during the lunar nights. Some anti-static brushes, used for neutralizing static electricity on materials like photographic film, contain a few microcuries of ^{210}Po as a source of charged particles. ^{210}Po was also used in initiators for atomic bombs through the (α,n) reaction with beryllium. Small neutron sources reliant on the (α,n) reaction also usually use polonium as a convenient source of alpha particles due to its comparatively low gamma emissions (allowing easy shielding) and high specific activity.

== Hazards ==
^{210}Po is extremely toxic; it and other polonium isotopes are some of the most radiotoxic substances to humans. With one microgram of ^{210}Po being more than enough to kill the average adult, it is 250,000 times more toxic than hydrogen cyanide by weight. This is a consequence of its ionizing alpha radiation, as alpha particles are especially damaging to organic tissues inside the body. However, ^{210}Po does not pose a radiation hazard when kept outside the body. The alpha particles it produces cannot penetrate the outer layer of dead skin cells.

The toxicity of ^{210}Po stems entirely from its radioactivity. It is not chemically toxic in itself, but its solubility in aqueous solution as well as that of its salts poses a hazard because its spread throughout the body is facilitated in solution. Intake of ^{210}Po occurs primarily through contaminated air, food, or water, as well as through open wounds. Once inside the body, ^{210}Po concentrates in soft tissues (especially in the reticuloendothelial system) and the bloodstream. Its biological half-life is approximately 50 days.

In the environment, ^{210}Po can accumulate in seafood. It has been detected in various organisms in the Baltic Sea, where it can propagate in, and thus contaminate, the food chain. ^{210}Po is also known to contaminate vegetation, primarily originating from the decay of atmospheric radon-222 and absorption from soil.

In particular, ^{210}Po attaches to, and concentrates in, tobacco leaves. Elevated concentrations of ^{210}Po in tobacco were documented as early as 1964, and cigarette smokers were thus found to be exposed to considerably greater doses of radiation from ^{210}Po and its parent ^{210}Pb. Heavy smokers may be exposed to the same amount of radiation (estimates vary from 100 µSv to 160 mSv per year) as individuals in Poland were from Chernobyl fallout traveling from Ukraine. As a result, ^{210}Po is most dangerous when inhaled from cigarette smoke.
