= Thorium-232 =

Isotope of thorium

General
- Symbol: ^{232}Th
- Names: thorium-232
- Protons (Z): 90
- Neutrons (N): 142

Nuclide data
- Natural abundance: 99.98%±0.02%
- Half-life (t_{1/2}): 1.40×10^{10} years
- Isotope mass: 232.0380536 Da
- Spin: 0+
- Parent isotopes: ^{236}U (α)^{232}Ac (β^{−})
- Decay products: ^{228}Ra

Decay modes
- Decay mode: Decay energy (MeV)
- alpha decay: 4.082

Thorium-232 (^{232}Th) is the main naturally occurring isotope of thorium, with a relative abundance of approximately 99.98%. It has a half-life of 14.0 billion years, which makes it the longest-lived isotope of thorium. It decays by alpha decay to radium-228; its decay chain terminates at stable lead-208.

Thorium-232 is a fertile material; it can capture a neutron to form thorium-233, which subsequently undergoes two successive beta decays to uranium-233, which is fissile. As such, it has been used in the thorium fuel cycle in nuclear reactors; various prototype thorium-fueled reactors have been designed. However, as of 2024, thorium fuel has not been widely adopted for commercial-scale nuclear power. In 2025, China reported thorium-to-uranium conversion in an experimental molten-salt reactor.

== Natural occurrence ==
The half-life of thorium-232 (14 billion years) is more than three times the age of the Earth; thorium-232 therefore occurs in nature as a primordial nuclide. Other thorium isotopes occur in nature in much smaller quantities as intermediate products in the decay chains of uranium-238, uranium-235, and thorium-232.

Some minerals that contain thorium include apatite, sphene, zircon, allanite, monazite, pyrochlore, thorite, and xenotime.

== Decay ==
Thorium-232 has a half-life of 14 billion years; it is itself an essentially pure alpha emitter with its first decay product radium-228. Radium-228 is itself unstable and leads to a decay chain known as the thorium series, which terminates at stable lead-208. The intermediates in the thorium-232 decay chain are all relatively short-lived; the longest-lived intermediate decay products are radium-228 and thorium-228, with half-lives of 5.75 years and 1.91 years, respectively. All others have half-lives under four days. The main decay branches are shown below:

$$\begin{array}{l}{}\\
\ce{^{232}_{90}Th->[\alpha][1.40 \times 10^{10} \ \ce y] {^{228}_{88}Ra} ->[\beta^-][5.75 \ \ce y] {^{228}_{89}Ac} ->[\beta^-][6.15 \ \ce h] {^{228}_{90}Th} -> [\alpha][1.9125 \ \ce y] {^{224}_{88}Ra} -> [\alpha][3.632 \ \ce d] {^{220}_{86}Rn}}
\\
\ce{^{220}_{86}Rn ->[\alpha][55.6 \ \ce s] {^{216}_{84}Po} ->[\alpha][144.0 \ \ce ms] {^{212}_{82}Pb} ->[\beta^-][10.627 \ \ce h] {^{212}_{83}Bi}}
\begin{Bmatrix}
\ce{->[64.06\% \beta^-][60.55 \ \ce{min}] {^{212}_{84}Po} ->[\alpha][294.4 \ \ce{ns}]} \\
\ce{->[35.94\% \alpha][60.55 \ \ce{min}] {^{208}_{81}Tl} ->[\beta^-][3.053 \ \ce{min}]}
\end{Bmatrix}
\ce{^{208}_{82}Pb}
\end{array}$$

The table shows the principal decay paths, with half-lives from NUBASE2020. The energy column gives ground-state-to-ground-state Q-values from AME2020, displayed in NuDat and rounded to 0.001 MeV. These values describe total decay energy, rather than individual particle energies.

Nuclide	Decay mode	Half-life (y = years)	Decay Q-value (MeV)	Decay product
^{232}Th	α	1.40×10^{10} y	4.082	^{228}Ra
^{228}Ra	β^{−}	5.75 y	0.046	^{228}Ac
^{228}Ac	β^{−}	6.15 h	2.124	^{228}Th
^{228}Th	α	1.9125 y	5.520	^{224}Ra
^{224}Ra	α	3.632 d	5.789	^{220}Rn
^{220}Rn	α	55.6 s	6.405	^{216}Po
^{216}Po	α	144.0 ms	6.906	^{212}Pb
^{212}Pb	β^{−}	10.627 h	0.569	^{212}Bi
^{212}Bi	β^{−} 64.06% α 35.94%	60.55 min	2.252; 6.207	^{212}Po^{208}Tl
^{212}Po	α	294.4 ns	8.954	^{208}Pb
^{208}Tl	β^{−}	3.053 min	4.998	^{208}Pb
^{208}Pb	stable			

=== Rare decay modes ===
Spontaneous fission accounts for about 1.1×10^{−9}% of thorium-232 decays, corresponding to a partial half-life of about 1.3×10^{21} years. Double beta decay to uranium-232 is also theoretically possible. A 2020 experimental search set lower half-life limits for such decays to excited states of uranium-232.

== Use in nuclear power ==
Thorium-232 is not fissile, but it can undergo fission with high-energy neutrons. Its use in a reactor fuel cycle requires a fissile driver, such as uranium or plutonium, to sustain a chain reaction. However, ^{232}Th is fertile: it can capture a neutron to form ^{233}Th, which undergoes a beta decay with a half-life of 21.8 minutes to ^{233}Pa, then another with a half-life of 27 days to form fissile ^{233}U.

Thorium is estimated to be about three to four times as abundant as uranium in Earth's upper crust. Uranium-233 produced in thorium fuel cycles raises proliferation concerns. Radiation from uranium-232 decay products can complicate fuel handling. The risks depend on fuel-cycle design and safeguards. A 1958 report described the Indian Point reactor under construction, with thorium as a fertile material to supplement uranium-235 fuel. The Shippingport light-water breeder reactor core operated with fuel containing uranium-233 and thorium. Thorium-based nuclear power has not seen large-scale commercial use as of 2024. Nevertheless, some countries such as India have actively pursued thorium-based nuclear power.

In November 2025, the Chinese Academy of Sciences reported thorium-to-uranium conversion following thorium loading in an experimental molten-salt reactor built by its Shanghai Institute of Applied Physics and partner institutions. The institute stated that it planned a 100-megawatt demonstration project by 2035.

Lighter: thorium-231	Thorium-232 is an isotope of thorium	Heavier: thorium-233
Decay product of: uranium-236 actinium-232	Decay chain of thorium-232	Decays to: radium-228
