= Targeted alpha-particle therapy =

Type of radiation therapy to treat cancer

Targeted alpha-particle therapy (or TAT) is an in-development method of targeted radionuclide therapy of various cancers. It employs radioactive substances which undergo alpha decay to treat diseased tissue at close proximity. It has the potential to provide highly targeted treatment, especially to microscopic tumour cells. Targets include leukemias, lymphomas, gliomas, melanoma, and peritoneal carcinomatosis. As in diagnostic nuclear medicine, appropriate radionuclides can be chemically bound to a targeting biomolecule which carries the combined radiopharmaceutical to a specific treatment point.

It has been said that "α-emitters are indispensable with regard to optimisation of strategies for tumour therapy".

== Advantages of alpha emitters ==
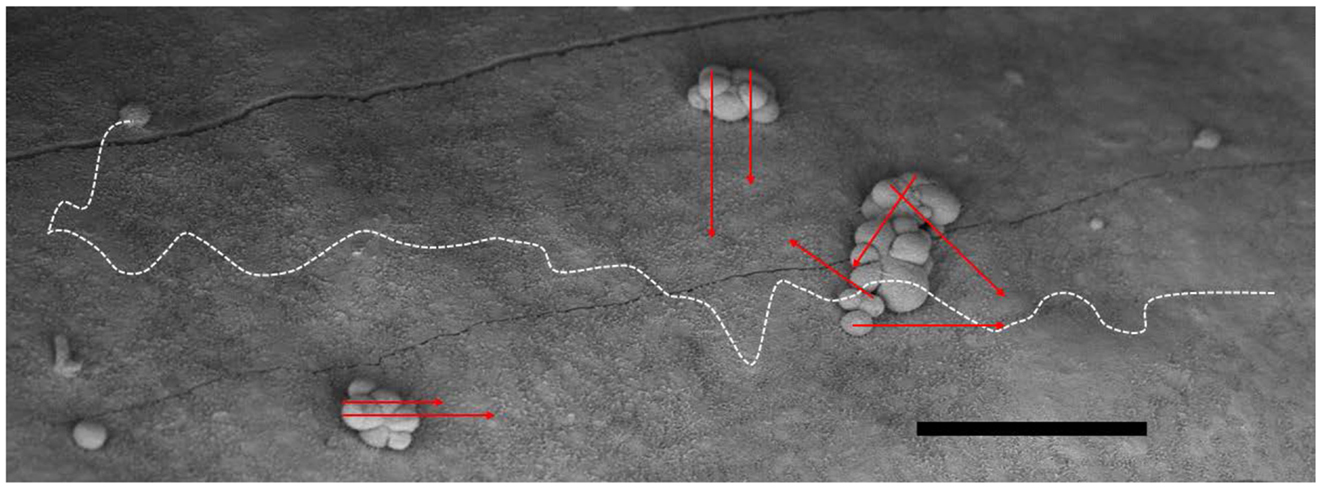
Comparison of range of α (red) and β− (white) particles

The primary advantage of alpha particle (α) emitters over other types of radioactive sources is their very high linear energy transfer (LET) and relative biological effectiveness (RBE). Beta particle (β) emitters such as yttrium-90 can travel considerable distances beyond the immediate tissue before depositing their energy, while alpha particles deposit their energy in 70–100 μm long tracks.

Alpha particles are more likely than other types of radiation to cause double-strand breaks to DNA molecules, which is one of several effective causes of cell death.

== Production ==
Some α emitting isotopes such as ^{225}Ac and ^{213}Bi are only available in limited quantities from ^{229}Th decay, although cyclotron production is feasible. Among alpha-emitting radiometals according to availability, chelation chemistry, and half-life, ^{212}Pb is also a promising candidate for targeted alpha-therapy.

The ARRONAX cyclotron can produce ^{211}At by irradiation of ^{209}Bi.

== Applications ==
Though many α-emitters exist, useful isotopes would have a sufficient energy to cause damage to cancer cells, and a half-life that is long enough to provide a therapeutic dose without remaining long enough to damage healthy tissue.

=== Immunotherapy ===
Several radionuclides have been studied for use in immunotherapy. Though β-emitters are more popular, in part due to their availability, trials have taken place involving ^{225}Ac, ^{211}At, ^{212}Pb and ^{213}Bi.

=== Peritoneal carcinomas ===
Treatment of peritoneal carcinomas has promising early results limited by availability of α-emitters compared to β-emitters.

=== Bone metastases ===
^{223}Ra was the first α-emitter approved by the FDA in the United States for treatment of bone metastases from prostate cancer, and is a recommended treatment in the UK by NICE. In a phase III trial comparing ^{223}Ra to a placebo, survival was significantly improved.

=== Leukaemia ===
Early trials of ^{225}Ac and ^{213}Bi have shown evidence of anti-tumour activity in Leukaemia patients.

=== Melanomas ===
Phase I trials on melanomas have shown ^{213}Bi is effective in causing tumour regression.

=== Solid tumours ===
The short path length of alpha particles in tissue, which makes them well suited to treatment of the above types of disease, is a negative when it comes to treatment of larger bodies of solid tumour by intravenous injection. Potential methods to solve this problem of delivery exist, such as direct intratumoral injection and anti-angiogenic drugs. Limited treatment experience of low grade malignant gliomas has shown possible efficacy.

== See also ==
- Unsealed source radiotherapy
- Selective internal radiation therapy
