= Radon-222 =

Most stable isotope of radon

General
- Symbol: ^{222}Rn
- Names: radon-222, Radium emanation
- Protons (Z): 86
- Neutrons (N): 136

Nuclide data
- Natural abundance: Trace
- Half-life (t_{1/2}): 3.8215 d
- Isotope mass: 222.0175760(21) Da
- Spin: 0
- Parent isotopes: ^{226}Ra (α)
- Decay products: ^{218}Po

Decay modes
- Decay mode: Decay energy (MeV)
- Alpha decay: 5.590

Radon-222 (^{222}Rn, Rn-222, historically also radium emanation) is the most stable isotope of radon, with a half-life of 3.82146 days. It is an intermediate in the decay chain of primordial uranium-238 and is the immediate decay product of radium-226. Radon-222 was first observed in 1899, and was identified as an isotope of a new element several years later. In 1957, the name radon, formerly the name of only radon-222, became the name of the element. Owing to its gaseous nature and high radioactivity, radon-222 is one of the leading causes of lung cancer.

== History ==
Following the 1898 discovery of radium through chemical analysis of radioactive ore, Marie and Pierre Curie observed a new radioactive substance emanating from radium in 1899 that was strongly radioactive for several days. Around the same time, Ernest Rutherford and Robert B. Owens observed a similar (though shorter-lived) emission from thorium compounds. German physicist Friedrich Ernst Dorn extensively studied these emanations in the early 1900s and attributed them to a new gaseous element, radon. In particular, he studied the product in the uranium series, radon-222, which he called radium emanation.

In the early 20th century, the element radon was known by several different names. Chemist William Ramsay, who extensively studied the element's chemical properties, suggested the name niton, and Rutherford originally suggested emanation. At that time, radon only referred to the isotope ^{222}Rn, whereas the names actinon and thoron denoted ^{219}Rn and ^{220}Rn, respectively. In 1957, the International Union of Pure and Applied Chemistry (IUPAC) promoted the name radon to refer to the element rather than just ^{222}Rn; this was done under a new rule concerning isotope naming conventions. This decision was controversial because it was believed to give undue credit to Dorn's identification of radon-222 over Rutherford's identification of radon-220, and the historical use of the name radon created confusion as to whether the element or the isotope ^{222}Rn was being discussed.

== Decay properties ==
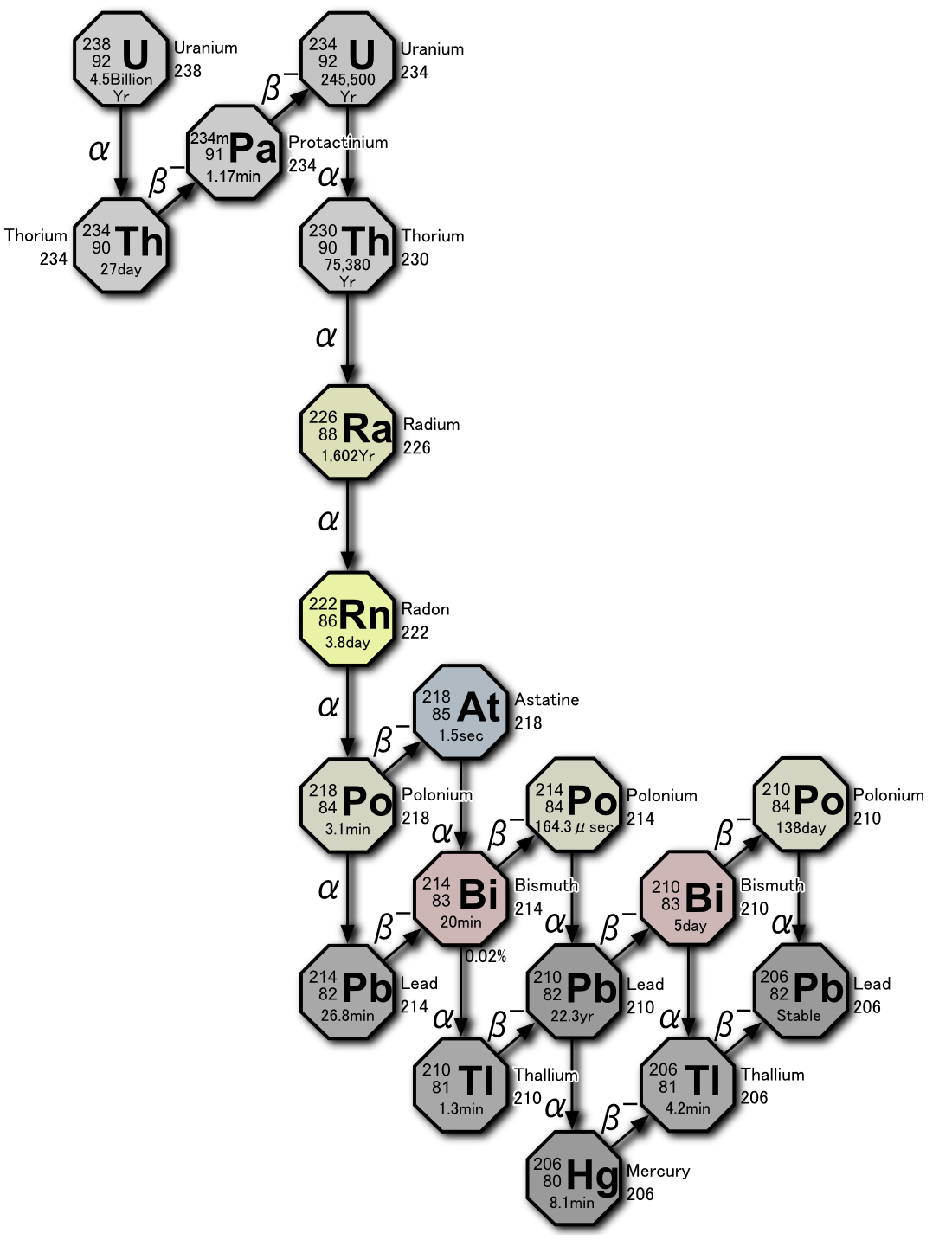
The decay chain of uranium-238, known as the uranium series or radium series, of which radon-222 is a member.

Radon-222 is generated in the uranium series from the alpha decay of radium-226, which has a half-life of 1600 years. Radon-222 itself alpha decays to polonium-218 with a half-life of 3.8215 days; it is the most stable isotope of radon. Its final decay product is stable lead-206.

In theory, ^{222}Rn is capable of double beta decay to ^{222}Ra, and depending on the mass difference between the two, single beta decay to ^{222}Fr may also be allowed. These decay modes have been searched for, yielding lower partial half-life limits of 8 years for both transitions. The latest edition of the Atomic Mass Evaluation gives a mass difference of (−6 ± 8) keV; thus the single beta decay is, probably, forbidden energetically.

== Occurrence and hazards ==
All radon isotopes are hazardous owing to their radioactivity, gaseous nature, chemical inertness, and radioactivity of their decay products (progeny). Radon-222 is especially dangerous because its longer half-life allows it to permeate soil and rocks, where it is produced in trace quantities from decays of uranium-238, and concentrate in buildings and uranium mines. This contrasts with the other natural isotopes that decay far more quickly (half-lives less than a minute) and thus do not contribute significantly to indoor radiation exposure. At higher concentrations, gaseous ^{222}Rn may be inhaled and decay before exhalation, which leads to accumulation of its short-lived daughters (including alpha-emitters ^{218}Po and ^{214}Po) in the lungs, where they are in intimate contact with the lung cells irradiated; thus, extended periods of exposure to ^{222}Rn and its progeny ultimately induce lung cancer. Alternatively, radon may enter the body through contaminated drinking water or through the decay of ingested radium – making radon diffusion one of the greatest dangers of radium. Thus, ^{222}Rn is a carcinogen; in fact, it is the second leading cause of lung cancer in the United States after cigarette smoking, with over 20,000 deaths per year attributed to radon-induced lung cancer.

== See also ==
- Isotopes of radon
