= Isotopes of polonium =

Isotopes of polonium (_{84}Po)
| Main isotopes | | | Decay | |
| Isotope | abundance | half-life (t_{1/2}) | mode | product |
|---|---|---|---|---|
| ^{206}Po | synth | 8.8 d | β^{+}94.5% | ^{206}Bi |
| ^{206}Po | synth | 8.8 d | α5.45% | ^{202}Pb |
| ^{208}Po | synth | 2.898 y | α | ^{204}Pb |
| ^{208}Po | synth | 2.898 y | β^{+}<0.01% | ^{208}Bi |
| ^{209}Po | synth | 124 y | α99.5% | ^{205}Pb |
| ^{209}Po | synth | 124 y | β^{+}0.454% | ^{209}Bi |
| ^{210}Po | trace | 138.376 d | α | ^{206}Pb |

There are 42 known isotopes of polonium (_{84}Po), all radioactive, stretching from ^{186}Po to ^{227}Po. The isotopes 210 through 218 occur naturally in the four principal decay chains; of these, ^{210}Po with a half-life of 138.376 days has the longest half-life and is, therefore, the most abundant by mass. It is also the most easily synthesized isotope, by neutron capture on natural bismuth, and so by far the most abundant artificial isotope as well.

Two other isotopes have longer lives: ^{209}Po with a half-life of 124 years and ^{208}Po with a half-life of 2.898 years. Both are made by using a cyclotron to bombard bismuth with protons.

== List of isotopes ==
| Nuclide (Note: ^{m}Po – Excited nuclear isomer.) | Historic name | Z | N | Isotopic mass (Da) (Note: ( ) – Uncertainty (1σ) is given in concise form in parentheses after the corresponding last digits.) (Note: # – Atomic mass marked #: value and uncertainty derived not from purely experimental data, but at least partly from trends from the Mass Surface (TMS).) | Discovery year | Half-life | Decay mode | Daughter isotope (Note: Bold italics symbol as daughter – Daughter product is nearly stable.) (Note: Bold symbol as daughter – Daughter product is stable.) | Spin and parity (Note: ( ) spin value – Indicates spin with weak assignment arguments.) (Note: # – Values marked # are not purely derived from experimental data, but at least partly from trends of neighboring nuclides (TNN).) | Isotopic abundance |
| Nuclide | Historic name | Excitation energy | | | Discovery year | Half-life | Decay mode | Daughter isotope | Spin and parity | Isotopic abundance |
|---|---|---|---|---|---|---|---|---|---|---|
| ^{186}Po | | 84 | 102 | 186.004403(20) | 2005 | 28+16 −6 μs | α | ^{182}Pb | 0+ | |
| ^{187}Po | | 84 | 103 | 187.003030(40) | 2005 | 1.40(25) ms | α | ^{183}Pb | 1/2−, 5/2− | |
| ^{187m}Po (Note: Order of ground state and isomer is uncertain.) | | 4(27) keV | | | (2006) (Note: Isomeric state only suggested, not included in the discovery database) | 0.5 ms | α | ^{183}Pb | 13/2+# | |
| ^{188}Po | | 84 | 104 | 187.999416(21) | 1999 | 270(30) μs | α | ^{184}Pb | 0+ | |
| ^{189}Po | | 84 | 105 | 188.998473(24) | 1999 | 3.5(5) ms | α | ^{185}Pb | (5/2−) | |
| ^{190}Po | | 84 | 106 | 189.995102(14) | 1996 | 2.45(5) ms | α | ^{186}Pb | 0+ | |
| ^{191}Po | | 84 | 107 | 190.994558(8) | 1993 | 22(1) ms | α | ^{187}Pb | 3/2− | |
| ^{191m}Po | | 61(11) keV | | | 1999 | 93(3) ms | α | ^{187}Pb | 13/2+ | |
| ^{192}Po | | 84 | 108 | 191.991340(11) | 1977 | 32.2(3) ms | α | ^{188}Pb | 0+ | |
| ^{192m}Po | | 2294.6(10) keV | | | 2003 | 580(100) ns | IT | ^{192}Po | 11− | |
| ^{193}Po | | 84 | 109 | 192.991062(16) | 1967 | 399(34) ms | α | ^{189}Pb | 3/2− | |
| ^{193m}Po | | 100(6) keV | | | 1977 | 245(11) ms | α | ^{189m1}Pb | 13/2+ | |
| ^{194}Po | | 84 | 110 | 193.988186(14) | 1967 | 392(4) ms | α | ^{190}Pb | 0+ | |
| ^{194m}Po | | 2313.4(3) keV | | | 1999 | 12.9(5) μs | IT | ^{194}Po | (10−) | |
| ^{195}Po | | 84 | 111 | 194.988066(6) | 1967 | 4.64(9) s | α (94%) | ^{191}Pb | 3/2− | |
| ^{195}Po | | 84 | 111 | 194.988066(6) | 1967 | 4.64(9) s | β^{+} (6%) | ^{195}Bi | 3/2− | |
| ^{195m}Po | | 148(9) keV | | | 1967 | 1.92(2) s | α | ^{191m1}Pb | 13/2+ | |
| ^{196}Po | | 84 | 112 | 195.985541(6) | 1967 | 5.63(7) s | α (94%) | ^{192}Pb | 0+ | |
| ^{196}Po | | 84 | 112 | 195.985541(6) | 1967 | 5.63(7) s | β^{+} (6%) | ^{196}Bi | 0+ | |
| ^{196m}Po | | 2493.9(4) keV | | | 1991 | 856(17) ns | IT | ^{196}Po | 11− | |
| ^{197}Po | | 84 | 113 | 196.985622(11) | 1965 | 53.6(9) s | β^{+} (56%) | ^{197}Bi | (3/2−) | |
| ^{197}Po | | 84 | 113 | 196.985622(11) | 1965 | 53.6(9) s | α (44%) | ^{193}Pb | (3/2−) | |
| ^{197m}Po | | 196(12) keV | | | 1965 | 25.8(1) s | α (84%) | ^{193m1}Pb | 13/2+ | |
| ^{197m}Po | | 196(12) keV | | | 1965 | 25.8(1) s | β^{+} ? | ^{197}Bi | 13/2+ | |
| ^{197m}Po | | 196(12) keV | | | 1965 | 25.8(1) s | IT ? | ^{197}Po | 13/2+ | |
| ^{198}Po | | 84 | 114 | 197.983389(19) | 1965 | 1.760(24) min | α (57%) | ^{194}Pb | 0+ | |
| ^{198}Po | | 84 | 114 | 197.983389(19) | 1965 | 1.760(24) min | β^{+} (43%) | ^{198}Bi | 0+ | |
| ^{198m1}Po | | 2565.92(20) keV | | | 1986 | 200(20) ns | IT | ^{198}Po | 11− | |
| ^{198m2}Po | | 2740(50)# keV | | | 1986 | 750(50) ns | IT | ^{198}Po | 12+ | |
| ^{199}Po | | 84 | 115 | 198.983640(6) | 1965 | 5.47(15) min | β^{+} (92.5%) | ^{199}Bi | 3/2− | |
| ^{199}Po | | 84 | 115 | 198.983640(6) | 1965 | 5.47(15) min | α (7.5%) | ^{195}Pb | 3/2− | |
| ^{199m}Po | | 311.7(27) keV | | | 1965 | 4.17(5) min | β^{+} (73.5%) | ^{199}Bi | 13/2+ | |
| ^{199m}Po | | 311.7(27) keV | | | 1965 | 4.17(5) min | α (24%) | ^{195}Pb | 13/2+ | |
| ^{199m}Po | | 311.7(27) keV | | | 1965 | 4.17(5) min | IT (2.5%) | ^{199}Po | 13/2+ | |
| ^{200}Po | | 84 | 116 | 199.981812(8) | 1951 | 11.51(8) min | β^{+} (88.9%) | ^{200}Bi | 0+ | |
| ^{200}Po | | 84 | 116 | 199.981812(8) | 1951 | 11.51(8) min | α (11.1%) | ^{196}Pb | 0+ | |
| ^{200m1}Po | | 2596.1(3) keV | | | 1985 | 100(10) ns | IT | ^{200}Po | 11- | |
| ^{200m2}Po | | 2817(7) keV | | | 1985 | 268(3) ns | IT | ^{200}Po | 12+ | |
| ^{201}Po | | 84 | 117 | 200.982264(5) | 1951 | 15.6(1) min | β^{+} (98.87%) | ^{201}Bi | 3/2− | |
| ^{201}Po | | 84 | 117 | 200.982264(5) | 1951 | 15.6(1) min | α (1.13%) | ^{197}Pb | 3/2− | |
| ^{201m}Po | | 423.8(24) keV | | | 1963 | 8.96(12) min | IT (56.2(12)%) | ^{201}Po | 13/2+ | |
| ^{201m}Po | | 423.8(24) keV | | | 1963 | 8.96(12) min | β^{+} (41.4(7)%) | ^{201}Bi | 13/2+ | |
| ^{201m}Po | | 423.8(24) keV | | | 1963 | 8.96(12) min | α (2.4(5)%) | ^{197}Pb | 13/2+ | |
| ^{202}Po | | 84 | 118 | 201.980739(9) | 1951 | 44.6(4) min | β^{+} (98.08%) | ^{202}Bi | 0+ | |
| ^{202}Po | | 84 | 118 | 201.980739(9) | 1951 | 44.6(4) min | α (1.92%) | ^{198}Pb | 0+ | |
| ^{202m}Po | | 1712(12) keV | | | 1971 | 110(15) ns | IT | ^{202}Po | 8+ | |
| ^{203}Po | | 84 | 119 | 202.981416(5) | 1951 | 36.7(5) min | β^{+} (99.89%) | ^{203}Bi | 5/2− | |
| ^{203}Po | | 84 | 119 | 202.981416(5) | 1951 | 36.7(5) min | α (0.11%) | ^{199}Pb | 5/2− | |
| ^{203m1}Po | | 641.68(14) keV | | | 1971 | 45(2) s | IT | ^{203}Po | 13/2+ | |
| ^{203m1}Po | | 641.68(14) keV | | | 1971 | 45(2) s | α ? | ^{199}Pb | 13/2+ | |
| ^{203m2}Po | | 2158.5(6) keV | | | 1986 | >200 ns | IT | ^{203}Po | | |
| ^{204}Po | | 84 | 120 | 203.980310(11) | 1951 | 3.519(12) h | β^{+} (99.33%) | ^{204}Bi | 0+ | |
| ^{204}Po | | 84 | 120 | 203.980310(11) | 1951 | 3.519(12) h | α (0.67%) | ^{200}Pb | 0+ | |
| ^{204m}Po | | 1639.03(6) keV | | | 1970 | 158.6(18) ns | IT | ^{204}Po | 8+ | |
| ^{205}Po | | 84 | 121 | 204.981190(11) | 1951 | 1.74(8) h | β^{+} (99.96%) | ^{205}Bi | 5/2− | |
| ^{205}Po | | 84 | 121 | 204.981190(11) | 1951 | 1.74(8) h | α (0.04%) | ^{201}Pb | 5/2− | |
| ^{205m1}Po | | 143.166(15) keV | | | 1971 | 310(60) ns | IT | ^{205}Po | 1/2− | |
| ^{205m2}Po | | 880.31(4) keV | | | 1962 | 645(20) μs | IT | ^{205}Po | 13/2+ | |
| ^{205m3}Po | | 1461.21(21) keV | | | 1973 | 57.4(9) ms | IT | ^{205}Po | 19/2− | |
| ^{205m4}Po | | 3087.2(4) keV | | | 1985 | 115(10) ns | IT | ^{205}Po | 29/2− | |
| ^{206}Po | | 84 | 122 | 205.980474(4) | 1947 | 8.8(1) d | β^{+} (94.55%) | ^{206}Bi | 0+ | |
| ^{206}Po | | 84 | 122 | 205.980474(4) | 1947 | 8.8(1) d | α (5.45%) | ^{202}Pb | 0+ | |
| ^{206m1}Po | | 1585.90(11) keV | | | 1970 | 232(4) ns | IT | ^{206}Po | 8+ | |
| ^{206m2}Po | | 2262.09(12) keV | | | 1986 | 1.05(6) μs | IT | ^{206}Po | 9− | |
| ^{207}Po | | 84 | 123 | 206.981593(7) | 1947 | 5.80(2) h | β^{+} (99.979%) | ^{207}Bi | 5/2− | |
| ^{207}Po | | 84 | 123 | 206.981593(7) | 1947 | 5.80(2) h | α (0.021%) | ^{203}Pb | 5/2− | |
| ^{207m1}Po | | 68.557(14) keV | | | 1963 | 205(10) ns | IT | ^{207}Po | 1/2− | |
| ^{207m2}Po | | 1115.076(17) keV | | | 1962 | 49(4) μs | IT | ^{207}Po | 13/2+ | |
| ^{207m3}Po | | 1383.16(7) keV | | | 1978 | 2.79(8) s | IT | ^{207}Po | 19/2− | |
| ^{208}Po | | 84 | 124 | 207.9812460(18) | 1947 | 2.898(2) y | α | ^{204}Pb | 0+ | |
| ^{208}Po | | 84 | 124 | 207.9812460(18) | 1947 | 2.898(2) y | β^{+} (0.0042%) | ^{208}Bi | 0+ | |
| ^{208m}Po | | 1528.22(4) keV | | | 1968 | 373(8) ns | IT | ^{208}Po | 8+ | |
| ^{209}Po | | 84 | 125 | 208.9824304(19) | 1949 | 124(3) y | α (99.546%) | ^{205}Pb | 1/2− | |
| ^{209}Po | | 84 | 125 | 208.9824304(19) | 1949 | 124(3) y | β^{+} (0.454%) | ^{209}Bi | 1/2− | |
| ^{209m}Po | | 4265.4(3) keV | | | 1974 | 119(4) ns | IT | ^{209}Po | 31/2− | |
| ^{210}Po (Note: Most common isotope) | Radium F | 84 | 126 | 209.9828737(12) | 1898 | 138.376(2) d | α | ^{206}Pb | 0+ | Trace (Note: Intermediate decay product of ^{238}U) |
| ^{210m1}Po | | 1556.97(3) keV | | | 1967 | 98.9(25) ns | IT | ^{210}Po | 8+ | |
| ^{210m2}Po | | 5057.65(5) keV | | | 1985 | 263(5) ns | IT | ^{210}Po | 16+ | |
| ^{211}Po | Actinium C' | 84 | 127 | 210.9866532(13) | 1913 | 516(3) ms | α | ^{207}Pb | 9/2+ | Trace (Note: Intermediate decay product of ^{235}U) |
| ^{211m1}Po | | 1462(5) keV | | | 1954 | 25.2(6) s | α (99.984%) | ^{207}Pb | (25/2+) | |
| ^{211m1}Po | | 1462(5) keV | | | 1954 | 25.2(6) s | IT (0.016%) | ^{211}Po | (25/2+) | |
| ^{211m2}Po | | 2135(5) keV | | | 1998 | 243(21) ns | IT | ^{211}Po | (31/2−) | |
| ^{211m3}Po | | 4872(6) keV | | | 1998 | 2.8(7) μs | IT | ^{211}Po | (43/2+) | |
| ^{212}Po | Thorium C' | 84 | 128 | 211.9888680(12) | 1906 | 294.4(8) ns | α | ^{208}Pb | 0+ | Trace (Note: Intermediate decay product of ^{232}Th) |
| ^{212m1}Po | | 2923(4) keV | | | 1962 | 45.1(6) s | α (99.93%) | ^{208}Pb | (18+) | |
| ^{212m1}Po | | 2923(4) keV | | | 1962 | 45.1(6) s | IT (0.07%) | ^{212}Po | (18+) | |
| ^{212m2}Po | | 3455 keV | | | 2022 | 1.9(3) μs | IT | ^{212}Po | (21−) | |
| ^{212m3}Po | | 3319 or 3852 keV | | | 2022 | 0.20(8) μs | IT | ^{212}Po | (23+) | |
| ^{213}Po | | 84 | 129 | 212.992857(3) | 1947 | 3.705(1) μs | α | ^{209}Pb | 9/2+ | Trace (Note: Intermediate decay product of ^{237}Np) |
| ^{214}Po | Radium C' | 84 | 130 | 213.9952013(16) | 1912 | 163.47(3) μs | α | ^{210}Pb | 0+ | Trace |
| ^{215}Po | Actinium A | 84 | 131 | 214.9994184(23) | 1911 | 1.781(5) ms | α | ^{211}Pb | 9/2+ | Trace |
| ^{215}Po | Actinium A | 84 | 131 | 214.9994184(23) | 1911 | 1.781(5) ms | β^{−} (2.3×10^{−4}%) | ^{215}At | 9/2+ | Trace |
| ^{216}Po | Thorium A | 84 | 132 | 216.0019134(19) | 1910 | 143.7(5) ms | α (Note: Theoretically capable of β^{−}β^{−} decay to ^{216}Rn) | ^{212}Pb | 0+ | Trace |
| ^{217}Po | | 84 | 133 | 217.006316(7) | 1956 | 1.53(5) s | α (97.5%) | ^{213}Pb | (9/2+) | Trace |
| ^{217}Po | | 84 | 133 | 217.006316(7) | 1956 | 1.53(5) s | β^{−} (2.5%) | ^{217}At | (9/2+) | Trace |
| ^{218}Po | Radium A | 84 | 134 | 218.0089712(21) | 1904 | 3.097(12) min | α (99.98%) | ^{214}Pb | 0+ | Trace |
| ^{218}Po | Radium A | 84 | 134 | 218.0089712(21) | 1904 | 3.097(12) min | β^{−} (0.02%) | ^{218}At | 0+ | Trace |
| ^{219}Po | | 84 | 135 | 219.013614(17) | 1998 | 10.3(10) min | β^{−} (71.8%) | ^{219}At | 9/2+# | |
| ^{219}Po | | 84 | 135 | 219.013614(17) | 1998 | 10.3(10) min | α (28.2%) | ^{215}Pb | 9/2+# | |
| ^{220}Po | | 84 | 136 | 220.016386(19) | 1998 | 10# s [>300 ns] | β^{−} ? | ^{220}At | 0+ | |
| ^{221}Po | | 84 | 137 | 221.021228(21) | 2010 | 2.2 +/- 0.7 min | β^{−} | ^{221}At | 9/2+# | |
| ^{222}Po | | 84 | 138 | 222.02414(4) | 2010 | 9.1 +/- 7.2 min | β^{−} | ^{222}At | 0+ | |
| ^{223}Po | | 84 | 139 | 223.02907(21)# | 2010 | 6# s [>300 ns] | β^{−} ? | ^{223}At | 11/2+# | |
| ^{224}Po | | 84 | 140 | 224.03211(21)# | 2010 | 3# min [>300 ns] | β^{−} ? | ^{224}At | 0+ | |
| ^{225}Po | | 84 | 141 | 225.03712(32)# | 2010 | 10# s [>300 ns] | β^{−} ? | ^{225}At | 3/2+# | |
| ^{226}Po | | 84 | 142 | 226.04031(43)# | 2010 | 1# min [>300 ns] | β^{−} ? | ^{226}At | 0+ | |
| ^{227}Po | | 84 | 143 | 227.04539(43)# | 2010 | 2# s [>300 ns] | β^{−} ? | ^{227}At | 5/2+# | |
This table header & footer:

Daughter products other than polonium

- Isotopes of astatine
- Isotopes of bismuth
- Isotopes of lead
