= Isotopes of bismuth =

Isotopes of bismuth (_{83}Bi)
Main isotopes			Decay	
Isotope	abundance	half-life (t_{1/2})	mode	product
^{207}Bi	synth	31.22 y	β^{+}	^{207}Pb
^{208}Bi	synth	3.68×10^{5} y	β^{+}	^{208}Pb
^{209}Bi	100%	2.01×10^{19} y	α	^{205}Tl
^{210}Bi	trace	5.012 d	β^{−}	^{210}Po
^{210}Bi	trace	5.012 d	α	^{206}Tl
^{210m}Bi	synth	3.04×10^{6} y	α	^{206}Tl

Standard atomic weight A_{r}°(Bi)
- 208.98040±0.00001; 208.98±0.01 (abridged)

Bismuth (_{83}Bi) has 41 known isotopes, ranging from ^{184}Bi to ^{224}Bi. Bismuth has one nearly stable isotope but no stable isotopes, the standard atomic weight can be given from that isotope, bismuth-209. Though it is now known to be radioactive, it may still be considered practically stable because it has a half-life of 2.01×10^{19} years, which is more than a billion times the age of the universe. As a result, it is the longest lived known alpha emitter. Bismuth-209 is also the heaviest nearly stable isotope, with the longest lived isotope with a greater atomic weight being thorium-232.

Besides ^{209}Bi, the most stable bismuth radioisotopes are ^{210m}Bi with a half-life of 3.04 million years, ^{208}Bi with a half-life of 368,000 years and ^{207}Bi, with a half-life of 31.22 years, none of which occur in nature. All other isotopes have half-lives under 15 days, most under two hours. Of naturally occurring radioisotopes, the most stable is radiogenic ^{210}Bi with a half-life of 5.012 days. ^{210m}Bi is unusual for being a nuclear isomer with a half-life many orders of magnitude longer than that of the ground state.

== List of isotopes ==
Nuclide (Note: ^{m}Bi – Excited nuclear isomer.)	Historic name	Z	N	Isotopic mass (Da) (Note: ( ) – Uncertainty (1σ) is given in concise form in parentheses after the corresponding last digits.) (Note: # – Atomic mass marked #: value and uncertainty derived not from purely experimental data, but at least partly from trends from the Mass Surface (TMS).)	Discovery year	Half-life (Note: Bold half-life – nearly stable, half-life longer than age of universe.)	Decay mode (Note: Modes of decay: EC: / Electron capture; IT: / Isomeric transition; p: / Proton emission)	Daughter isotope (Note: Bold symbol as daughter – Daughter product is stable.)	Spin and parity (Note: ( ) spin value – Indicates spin with weak assignment arguments.) (Note: # – Values marked # are not purely derived from experimental data, but at least partly from trends of neighboring nuclides (TNN).)	Isotopic abundance
Nuclide	Historic name	Excitation energy			Discovery year	Half-life	Decay mode	Daughter isotope	Spin and parity	Isotopic abundance
^{184}Bi		83	101	184.001347(131)#	2003	6.6(1.5) ms	α	^{180}Tl	3+#	
^{184m}Bi (Note: Order of ground state and isomer is uncertain.)		150(100) keV			2003	13(2) ms	α	^{180}Tl	10−#	
^{185}Bi		83	102	184.99760(9)#	1996	2.8+2.3 −1.0 μs	p (92%)	^{184}Pb	(1/2+)	
^{185}Bi		83	102	184.99760(9)#	1996	2.8+2.3 −1.0 μs	α (8%)	^{181}Tl	(1/2+)	
^{185m}Bi		70(50) keV			2021	58(2) μs	IT	^{185}Bi	(7/2−, 9/2−)	
^{186}Bi		83	103	185.996623(18)	1997	14.8(7) ms	α (99.99%)	^{182}Tl	(3+)	
^{186}Bi		83	103	185.996623(18)	1997	14.8(7) ms	β^{+} (?%)	^{186}Pb	(3+)	
^{186}Bi		83	103	185.996623(18)	1997	14.8(7) ms	β^{+}, SF (0.011%)	(various)	(3+)	
^{186m}Bi		170(100) keV			1997	9.8(4) ms	α (99.99%)	^{182}Tl	(10−)	
^{186m}Bi		170(100) keV			1997	9.8(4) ms	β^{+} (?%)	^{186}Pb	(10−)	
^{186m}Bi		170(100) keV			1997	9.8(4) ms	β^{+}, SF (0.011%)	(various)	(10−)	
^{187}Bi		83	104	186.993147(11)	1999	37(2) ms	α	^{183}Tl	(9/2−)	
^{187m1}Bi		108(8) keV			1999	370(20) μs	α	^{183}Tl	1/2+	
^{187m2}Bi		252(3) keV			2002	7(5) μs	IT	^{187}Bi	(13/2+)	
^{188}Bi		83	105	187.992276(12)	1980	60(3) ms	α	^{184}Tl	(3+)	
^{188}Bi		83	105	187.992276(12)	1980	60(3) ms	β^{+}, SF (0.0014%)	(various)	(3+)	
^{188m1}Bi		66(30) keV			2006	>5 μs			7+#	
^{188m2}Bi		153(30) keV			1997	265(15) ms	α	^{184}Tl	(10−)	
^{188m2}Bi		153(30) keV			1997	265(15) ms	β^{+}, SF (0.0046%)	(various)	(10−)	
^{188m3}Bi					2022	250(5) ms	IT	^{188}Bi		
^{189}Bi		83	106	188.989195(22)	1973	688(5) ms	α	^{185}Tl	9/2−	
^{189m1}Bi		184(5) keV			1993	5.0(1) ms	α (83%)	^{185}Tl	1/2+	
^{189m1}Bi		184(5) keV			1993	5.0(1) ms	IT (17%)	^{189}Bi	1/2+	
^{189m2}Bi		357.6(5) keV			2001	880(50) ns	IT	^{189}Bi	13/2+	
^{190}Bi		83	107	189.988625(23)	1972	6.3(1) s	α (77%)	^{186}Tl	(3+)	
^{190}Bi		83	107	189.988625(23)	1972	6.3(1) s	β^{+} (23%)	^{190}Pb	(3+)	
^{190}Bi		83	107	189.988625(23)	1972	6.3(1) s	β^{+}, SF (6×10^{−6}%)	(various)	(3+)	
^{190m1}Bi		120(40) keV			1988	6.2(1) s	α (70%)	^{186}Tl	10−	
^{190m1}Bi		120(40) keV			1988	6.2(1) s	β^{+} (30%)	^{190}Pb	10−	
^{190m1}Bi		120(40) keV			1988	6.2(1) s	β^{+}, SF (4×10^{−6}%)	(various)	10−	
^{190m2}Bi		121(15) keV			2009	175(8) ns	IT	^{190}Bi	(5−)	
^{190m3}Bi		394(40) keV			2001	1.3(8) μs	IT	^{190}Bi	(8−)	
^{191}Bi		83	108	190.985787(8)	1972	12.4(3) s	α (51%)	^{187}Tl	9/2−	
^{191}Bi		83	108	190.985787(8)	1972	12.4(3) s	β^{+} (49%)	^{191}Pb	9/2−	
^{191m1}Bi		242(4) keV			1981	125(8) ms	α (68%)	^{187}Tl	1/2+	
^{191m1}Bi		242(4) keV			1981	125(8) ms	IT (?%)	^{191}Bi	1/2+	
^{191m1}Bi		242(4) keV			1981	125(8) ms	β^{+} (?%)	^{191}Pb	1/2+	
^{191m2}Bi		429.7(5) keV			2004	562(10) ns	IT	^{191}Bi	13/2+	
^{191m3}Bi		1875(25) keV			2004	400(40) ns	IT	^{191}Bi	25/2-#	
^{192}Bi		83	109	191.98547(3)	1970	34.6(9) s	β^{+} (88%)	^{192}Pb	(3+)	
^{192}Bi		83	109	191.98547(3)	1970	34.6(9) s	α (12%)	^{188}Tl	(3+)	
^{192m}Bi		140(30) keV			1987	39.6(4) s	β^{+} (90%)	^{192}Pb	10−	
^{192m}Bi		140(30) keV			1987	39.6(4) s	α (10%)	^{188}Tl	10−	
^{193}Bi		83	110	192.982947(8)	1970	63.6(30) s	β^{+} (96.5%)	^{193}Pb	9/2−	
^{193}Bi		83	110	192.982947(8)	1970	63.6(30) s	α (3.5%)	^{189}Tl	9/2−	
^{193m1}Bi		305(6) keV			1971	3.20(14) s	α (84%)	^{189}Tl	1/2+	
^{193m1}Bi		305(6) keV			1971	3.20(14) s	β^{+} (16%)	^{193}Pb	1/2+	
^{193m2}Bi		605.53(18) keV			2004	153(10) ns	IT	^{193}Bi	13/2+	
^{193m3}Bi		2349.6(6) keV			2004	85(3) μs	IT	^{193}Bi	29/2+	
^{193m4}Bi		2405.1(7) keV			2004	3.02(8) μs	IT	^{193}Bi	(29/2−)	
^{194}Bi		83	111	193.982799(6)	1970	95(3) s	β^{+} (99.54%)	^{194}Pb	3+	
^{194}Bi		83	111	193.982799(6)	1970	95(3) s	α (0.46%)	^{190}Tl	3+	
^{194m1}Bi		150(50) keV			1976	125(2) s	β^{+}	^{194}Pb	(6+, 7+)	
^{194m2}Bi		163(4) keV			1988	115(4) s	β^{+} (99.80%)	^{194}Pb	(10−)	
^{194m2}Bi		163(4) keV			1988	115(4) s	α (0.20%)	^{190}Tl	(10−)	
^{195}Bi		83	112	194.980649(6)	1970	183(4) s	β^{+} (99.97%)	^{195}Pb	9/2−	
^{195}Bi		83	112	194.980649(6)	1970	183(4) s	α (0.030%)	^{191}Tl	9/2−	
^{195m1}Bi		399(6) keV			1974	87(1) s	β^{+} (67%)	^{195}Pb	1/2+	
^{195m1}Bi		399(6) keV			1974	87(1) s	α (33%)	^{191}Tl	1/2+	
^{195m2}Bi		2381.0(5) keV			1986	614(5) ns	IT	^{195}Bi	(29/2−)	
^{195m3}Bi		2615.9(5) keV			2015	1.49(1) μs	IT	^{195}Bi	29/2+	
^{196}Bi		83	113	195.980667(26)	1976	5.13(20) min	β^{+}	^{196}Pb	(3+)	
^{196}Bi		83	113	195.980667(26)	1976	5.13(20) min	α (0.00115%)	^{192}Tl	(3+)	
^{196m1}Bi		166.4(29) keV			1987	0.6(5) s	IT	^{196}Bi	(7+)	
^{196m2}Bi		272(3) keV			1987	4.00(5) min	β^{+} (74.2%)	^{196}Pb	(10−)	
^{196m2}Bi		272(3) keV			1987	4.00(5) min	IT (25.8%)	^{196}Bi	(10−)	
^{196m2}Bi		272(3) keV			1987	4.00(5) min	α (3.8×10^{−4}%)	^{192}Tl	(10−)	
^{197}Bi		83	114	196.978865(9)	1970	9.33(50) min	β^{+}	^{197}Pb	9/2−	
^{197m1}Bi		533(12) keV			1991	5.04(16) min	α (55%)	^{193}Tl	1/2+	
^{197m1}Bi		533(12) keV			1991	5.04(16) min	β^{+} (45%)	^{197}Pb	1/2+	
^{197m2}Bi		2403(12) keV			1986	263(13) ns	IT	^{197}Bi	(29/2−)	
^{197m3}Bi		2929.5(5) keV			1986	209(30) ns	IT	^{197}Bi	(31/2−)	
^{198}Bi		83	115	197.979201(30)	1950	10.3(3) min	β^{+}	^{198}Pb	3+	
^{198m1}Bi		290(40) keV			1992	11.6(3) min	β^{+}	^{198}Pb	7+	
^{198m2}Bi		540(40) keV			1972	7.7(5) s	IT	^{198}Bi	10−	
^{199}Bi		83	116	198.977673(11)	1950	27(1) min	β^{+}	^{199}Pb	9/2−	
^{199m1}Bi		667(3) keV			1964	24.70(15) min	β^{+} (>98%)	^{199}Pb	(1/2+)	
^{199m1}Bi		667(3) keV			1964	24.70(15) min	IT (<2%)	^{199}Bi	(1/2+)	
^{199m1}Bi		667(3) keV			1964	24.70(15) min	α (0.01%)	^{195}Tl	(1/2+)	
^{199m2}Bi		1962(23) keV			1985	0.10(3) μs	IT	^{199}Bi	25/2+#	
^{199m3}Bi		2548(23) keV			1985	168(13) ns	IT	^{199}Bi	29/2−#	
^{200}Bi		83	117	199.978131(24)	1950	36.4(5) min	β^{+}	^{200}Pb	7+	
^{200m1}Bi		100(70) keV			(1978) (Note: Only published in a conference proceeding and not a refereed journal)	31(2) min	β^{+} (?%)	^{200}Pb	(2+)	
^{200m1}Bi		100(70) keV			(1978)	31(2) min	IT (?%)	^{200}Bi	(2+)	
^{200m2}Bi		428.20(10) keV			1972	400(50) ms	IT	^{200}Bi	(10−)	
^{201}Bi		83	118	200.976995(13)	1950	103(3) min	β^{+}	^{201}Pb	9/2−	
^{201m1}Bi		846.35(18) keV			1950	57.5(21) min	β^{+}	^{201}Pb	1/2+	
^{201m1}Bi		846.35(18) keV			1950	57.5(21) min	α (?%)	^{197}Tl	1/2+	
^{201m2}Bi		1973(23) keV			1982	118(28) ns	IT	^{201}Bi	25/2+#	
^{201m3}Bi		2012(23) keV			1985	105(75) ns	IT	^{201}Bi	27/2+#	
^{201m4}Bi		2781(23) keV			1982	124(4) ns	IT	^{201}Bi	29/2−#	
^{202}Bi		83	119	201.977723(15)	1951	1.72(5) h	β^{+}	^{202}Pb	5+	
^{202}Bi		83	119	201.977723(15)	1951	1.72(5) h	α (<10^{−5}%)	^{198}Tl	5+	
^{202m1}Bi		625(12) keV			1981	3.04(6) μs	IT	^{202}Bi	10−#	
^{202m2}Bi		2617(12) keV			1981	310(50) ns	IT	^{202}Bi	(17+)	
^{203}Bi		83	120	202.976892(14)	1950	11.76(5) h	β^{+}	^{203}Pb	9/2−	
^{203m1}Bi		1098.21(9) keV			1982	305(5) ms	IT	^{203}Bi	1/2+	
^{203m2}Bi		2041.5(6) keV			1978	194(30) ns	IT	^{203}Bi	25/2+	
^{204}Bi		83	121	203.977836(10)	1947	11.22(10) h	β^{+}	^{204}Pb	6+	
^{204m1}Bi		805.5(3) keV			1974	13.0(1) ms	IT	^{204}Bi	10−	
^{204m2}Bi		2833.4(11) keV			1974	1.07(3) ms	IT	^{204}Bi	17+	
^{205}Bi		83	122	204.977385(5)	1951	14.91(7) d	β^{+}	^{205}Pb	9/2−	
^{205m1}Bi		1497.17(9) keV			1969	7.9(7) μs	IT	^{205}Bi	1/2+	
^{205m2}Bi		2064.7(4) keV			1978	100(6) ns	IT	^{205}Bi	21/2+	
^{205m3}Bi		2139.0(7) keV			1978	220(25) ns	IT	^{205}Bi	25/2+	
^{205m4}Bi		7913+x keV			2022	8(2) ms	IT	^{205}Bi	(51/2−)	
^{206}Bi		83	123	205.978499(8)	1947	6.243(3) d	β^{+}	^{206}Pb	6+	
^{206m1}Bi		59.897(17) keV			1958	7.7(2) μs	IT	^{206}Bi	4+	
^{206m2}Bi		1044.8(7) keV			1973	890(10) μs	IT	^{206}Bi	10−	
^{206m3}Bi		9233.3(8) keV			2012	155(15) ns	IT	^{206}Bi	(28−)	
^{206m4}Bi		10170.5(8) keV			2012	>2 μs	IT	^{206}Bi	(31+)	
^{207}Bi		83	124	206.9784706(26)	1950	31.22(17) y	β^{+}	^{207}Pb	9/2−	
^{207m}Bi		2101.61(16) keV			1967	182(6) μs	IT	^{207}Bi	21/2+	
^{208}Bi		83	125	207.9797421(25)	1953	3.68(4)×10^{5} y	β^{+}	^{208}Pb	5+	
^{208m}Bi		1571.1(4) keV			1961	2.58(4) ms	IT	^{208}Bi	10−	
^{209}Bi (Note: Formerly believed to be final decay product of 4n+1 decay chain) (Note: Primordial radioisotope, also some is radiogenic from the extinct nuclide ^{237}Np)		83	126	208.9803986(15)	1924	2.01(8)×10^{19} y (Note: Formerly believed to be the heaviest stable nuclide)	α	^{205}Tl	9/2−	1.0000
^{210}Bi	Radium E	83	127	209.9841202(15)	1905	5.012(5) d	β^{−}	^{210}Po	1−	Trace (Note: Intermediate decay product of ^{238}U)
^{210}Bi	Radium E	83	127	209.9841202(15)	1905	5.012(5) d	α (1.32×10^{−4}%)	^{206}Tl	1−	Trace
^{210m}Bi		271.31(11) keV			1950	3.04(6)×10^{6} y	α (Note: Theoretically capable of isomeric transition to ^{210}Bi with a partial half-life of ~5.5×10^{20} years or β^{−} decay to ^{210}Po with a partial half-life over 10^{13} years.)	^{206}Tl	9−	
^{211}Bi	Actinium C	83	128	210.987269(6)	1905	2.14(2) min	α (99.72%)	^{207}Tl	9/2−	Trace (Note: Intermediate decay product of ^{235}U)
^{211}Bi	Actinium C	83	128	210.987269(6)	1905	2.14(2) min	β^{−} (0.276%)	^{211}Po	9/2−	Trace
^{211m}Bi		1257(10) keV			1998	1.4(3) μs	IT	^{211}Bi	(25/2−)	
^{212}Bi	Thorium C	83	129	211.9912850(20)	1905	60.55(6) min	β^{−} (64.05%)	^{212}Po	1−	Trace (Note: Intermediate decay product of ^{232}Th)
^{212}Bi	Thorium C	83	129	211.9912850(20)	1905	60.55(6) min	α (35.94%)	^{208}Tl	1−	Trace
^{212}Bi	Thorium C	83	129	211.9912850(20)	1905	60.55(6) min	β^{−}, α (0.014%)	^{208}Pb	1−	Trace
^{212m1}Bi		250(30) keV			1978	25.0(2) min	α (67%)	^{208}Tl	(8−, 9−)	
^{212m1}Bi		250(30) keV			1978	25.0(2) min	β^{−}, α (30%)	^{208}Pb	(8−, 9−)	
^{212m1}Bi		250(30) keV			1978	25.0(2) min	β^{−} (3%)	^{212}Po	(8−, 9−)	
^{212m2}Bi		1479(30) keV			1978	7.0(3) min	β^{−}	^{212}Po	(18−)	
^{213}Bi (Note: Used in medicine such as for cancer treatment.)		83	130	212.994384(5)	1947	45.60(4) min	β^{−} (97.91%)	^{213}Po	9/2−	Trace (Note: Intermediate decay product of ^{237}Np)
^{213}Bi		83	130	212.994384(5)	1947	45.60(4) min	α (2.09%)	^{209}Tl	9/2−	Trace
^{213m}Bi		1353(21) keV			2012	>168 s			25/2−#	
^{214}Bi	Radium C	83	131	213.998711(12)	1904	19.9(4) min	β^{−} (99.98%)	^{214}Po	1−	Trace
^{214}Bi	Radium C	83	131	213.998711(12)	1904	19.9(4) min	α (0.021%)	^{210}Tl	1−	Trace
^{214}Bi	Radium C	83	131	213.998711(12)	1904	19.9(4) min	β^{−}, α (0.003%)	^{210}Pb	1−	Trace
^{214m}Bi		539(30) keV			2021	>93 s			8−#	
^{215}Bi		83	132	215.001749(6)	1953	7.62(13) min	β^{−} (Note: Theoretically capable of α decay to ^{211}Tl; the branching ratio is expected to be ~8×10^{−5}% (partial half-life ~18.1 y).)	^{215}Po	(9/2−)	Trace
^{215m}Bi		1367(20) keV			2003	36.9(6) s	IT (76.9%)	^{215}Bi	(25/2−)	
^{215m}Bi		1367(20) keV			2003	36.9(6) s	β^{−} (23.1%)	^{215}Po	(25/2−)	
^{216}Bi		83	133	216.006306(12)	1989	2.21(4) min	β^{−}	^{216}Po	(6−, 7−)	
^{216m}Bi		24(19) keV			2000	6.6(21) min	β^{−}	^{216}Po	3−#	
^{217}Bi		83	134	217.009372(19)	1998	98.5(13) s	β^{−}	^{217}Po	9/2−#	
^{217m}Bi		1491(20) keV			2014	3.0(2) μs	IT	^{217}Bi	25/2−#	
^{218}Bi		83	135	218.014188(29)	1998	33(1) s	β^{−}	^{218}Po	8−#	
^{219}Bi		83	136	219.01752(22)#	2010	8.7(29) s	β^{−}	^{219}Po	9/2−#	
^{220}Bi		83	137	220.02250(32)#	2010	9.5(57) s	β^{−}	^{220}Po	1−#	
^{221}Bi		83	138	221.02598(32)#	2010	2# s [>300 ns]			9/2−#	
^{222}Bi		83	139	222.03108(32)#	2010	3# s [>300 ns]			1−#	
^{223}Bi		83	140	223.03461(43)#	2010	1# s [>300 ns]			9/2−#	
^{224}Bi		83	141	224.03980(43)#	2010	1# s [>300 ns]			1−#	
This table header & footer:

== Bismuth-213 ==
Bismuth-213 (^{213}Bi) has a half-life of 45.6 minutes and decays mainly by beta emission to polonium-213; with only 2.1% going via alpha emission to thallium-209; however, as the polonium instantly decays by alpha, one alpha particle is emitted per atom. The amounts needed for medical use are always produced through its decay chain (the neptunium series) from either thorium-229 (limited supply due to the long life of that isotope) or actinium-225, which can be produced directly from radium-226, for example by bombardment with bremsstrahlung photons from a linear particle accelerator, knocking out a neutron and through beta decay giving actinium-225.

In 1997, an antibody conjugate with ^{213}Bi was used to treat patients with leukemia, and this isotope has otherwise been used in targeted alpha therapy (TAT) to treat a variety of cancers.

Bismuth-213 is also produced in the decay of uranium-233, the fuel bred by thorium reactors, but as mentioned this goes through the long-lived thorium-229, so the production rates from each reactor will not be large.

== See also ==
Daughter products other than bismuth

- Isotopes of polonium
- Isotopes of lead
- Isotopes of thallium
