= Isotopes of lead =

Isotopes of lead (_{82}Pb)
Main isotopes			Decay	
Isotope	abundance	half-life (t_{1/2})	mode	product
^{202}Pb	synth	5.25×10^{4} y	ε	^{202}Tl
^{204}Pb	1.40%	stable		
^{205}Pb	synth	1.70×10^{7} y	ε	^{205}Tl
^{206}Pb	24.1%	stable		
^{207}Pb	22.1%	stable		
^{208}Pb	52.4%	stable		
^{209}Pb	trace	3.235 h	β^{−}	^{209}Bi
^{210}Pb	trace	22.2 y	β^{−}	^{210}Bi
^{210}Pb	trace	22.2 y	α	^{206}Hg
^{211}Pb	trace	36.16 min	β^{−}	^{211}Bi
^{212}Pb	trace	10.627 h	β^{−}	^{212}Bi
^{214}Pb	trace	27.06 min	β^{−}	^{214}Bi
Isotopic abundances vary greatly by sample

Standard atomic weight A_{r}°(Pb)
- [206.14, 207.94]; 207.2±1.1 (abridged)

Lead (_{82}Pb) has four observationally stable isotopes: ^{204}Pb, ^{206}Pb, ^{207}Pb, ^{208}Pb. Lead-204 is entirely a primordial nuclide and is not a radiogenic nuclide. The three isotopes lead-206, lead-207, and lead-208 represent the ends of three decay chains: the uranium series (or radium series), the actinium series, and the thorium series, respectively; a fourth decay chain, the neptunium series, terminates with the thallium isotope ^{205}Tl. The three series terminating in lead represent the decay chain products of long-lived primordial ^{238}U, ^{235}U, and ^{232}Th. Each isotope also occurs, to some extent, as primordial isotopes that were made in supernovae, rather than radiogenically as daughter products. The fixed ratio of lead-204 to the primordial amounts of the other lead isotopes may be used as the baseline to estimate the extra amounts of radiogenic lead present in rocks as a result of decay from uranium and thorium. This is the basis for lead–lead dating and uranium–lead dating.

The longest-lived radioisotopes, both decaying by electron capture, are ^{205}Pb with a half-life of 17.0 million years and ^{202}Pb with a half-life of 52,500 years. A shorter-lived naturally occurring radioisotope, ^{210}Pb with a half-life of 22.2 years, is useful for studying the sedimentation chronology of environmental samples on time scales shorter than 100 years.

The heaviest stable isotope, ^{208}Pb, belongs to this element. (The more massive ^{209}Bi, long considered to be stable, actually has a half-life of 2.01×10^{19} years.) ^{208}Pb is also a doubly magic isotope, as it has 82 protons and 126 neutrons. It is the heaviest doubly magic nuclide known.

The four primordial isotopes of lead are all observationally stable, meaning that they are predicted to undergo radioactive decay but no decay has been observed yet. These four isotopes are predicted to undergo alpha decay and become isotopes of mercury which are themselves radioactive or observationally stable.

There are trace quantities existing of the radioactive isotopes 209–214. The largest and most important is lead-210 as it has by far the longest half-life (22.2 years) and occurs in the abundant uranium decay series. Lead-211, -212, and -214 are present in the decay chains of uranium-235, thorium-232, and uranium-238, further, making these three lead isotopes also detectable in natural sources. The more minute traces of lead-209 arise from three rare decay branches: the beta-delayed-neutron decay of thallium-210 (in the uranium series), the last step of the neptunium series, traces of which are produced by neutron capture in uranium ores, and the very rare cluster decay of radium-223 (yielding also carbon-14). Lead-213 also occurs in a minor branch of the neptunium series. Lead-210 is particularly useful for helping to identify the ages of samples by measuring its ratio to lead-206 (both isotopes are present in a single decay chain).

In total, 43 lead isotopes have been synthesized, from ^{178}Pb to ^{220}Pb.

== List of isotopes ==
Nuclide (Note: ^{m}Pb – Excited nuclear isomer.)	Historic name	Z	N	Isotopic mass (Da) (Note: ( ) – Uncertainty (1σ) is given in concise form in parentheses after the corresponding last digits.) (Note: # – Atomic mass marked #: value and uncertainty derived not from purely experimental data, but at least partly from trends from the Mass Surface (TMS).)	Discovery year	Half-life	Decay mode (Note: Modes of decay: EC: / Electron capture; IT: / Isomeric transition)	Daughter isotope (Note: Bold italics symbol as daughter – Daughter product is nearly stable.) (Note: Bold symbol as daughter – Daughter product is stable.)	Spin and parity (Note: ( ) spin value – Indicates spin with weak assignment arguments.) (Note: # – Values marked # are not purely derived from experimental data, but at least partly from trends of neighboring nuclides (TNN).)	Natural abundance (mole fraction)	
Nuclide	Historic name	Excitation energy			Discovery year	Half-life	Decay mode	Daughter isotope	Spin and parity	Normal proportion	Range of variation
^{178}Pb		82	96	178.003836(25)	2016	250(80) μs	α	^{174}Hg	0+		
^{178}Pb		82	96	178.003836(25)	2016	250(80) μs	β^{+}?	^{178}Tl	0+		
^{179}Pb		82	97	179.002(87)	2010	2.7(2) ms	α	^{175}Hg	(9/2−)		
^{180}Pb		82	98	179.997916(13)	1996	4.1(3) ms	α	^{176}Hg	0+		
^{181}Pb		82	99	180.996661(91)	1989	39.0(8) ms	α	^{177}Hg	(9/2−)		
^{181}Pb		82	99	180.996661(91)	1989	39.0(8) ms	β^{+}?	^{181}Tl	(9/2−)		
^{182}Pb		82	100	181.992674(13)	1986	55(5) ms	α	^{178}Hg	0+		
^{182}Pb		82	100	181.992674(13)	1986	55(5) ms	β^{+}?	^{182}Tl	0+		
^{183}Pb		82	101	182.991863(31)	1980	535(30) ms	α	^{179}Hg	3/2−		
^{183}Pb		82	101	182.991863(31)	1980	535(30) ms	β^{+}?	^{183}Tl	3/2−		
^{183m}Pb		94(8) keV			2002	415(20) ms	α	^{179}Hg	13/2+		
^{183m}Pb		94(8) keV			2002	415(20) ms	β^{+}?	^{183}Tl	13/2+		
^{183m}Pb		94(8) keV			2002	415(20) ms	IT?	^{183}Pb	13/2+		
^{184}Pb		82	102	183.988136(14)	1980	490(25) ms	α (80%)	^{180}Hg	0+		
^{184}Pb		82	102	183.988136(14)	1980	490(25) ms	β^{+} (20%)	^{184}Tl	0+		
^{185}Pb		82	103	184.987610(17)	1975	6.3(4) s	β^{+} (66%)	^{185}Tl	3/2−		
^{185}Pb		82	103	184.987610(17)	1975	6.3(4) s	α (34%)	^{181}Hg	3/2−		
^{185m}Pb (Note: Order of ground state and isomer is uncertain.)		70(50) keV			1975	4.07(15) s	α (50%)	^{181}Hg	13/2+		
^{185m}Pb		70(50) keV			1975	4.07(15) s	β^{+} (50%)	^{185}Tl	13/2+		
^{186}Pb		82	104	185.984239(12)	1972	4.82(3) s	β^{+} (60%)	^{186}Tl	0+		
^{186}Pb		82	104	185.984239(12)	1972	4.82(3) s	α (40%)	^{182}Hg	0+		
^{187}Pb		82	105	186.9839108(55)	1972	15.2(3) s	β^{+} (90.5%)	^{187}Tl	3/2−		
^{187}Pb		82	105	186.9839108(55)	1972	15.2(3) s	α (9.5%)	^{183}Hg	3/2−		
^{187m1}Pb		19(10) keV			1981	18.3(3) s	β^{+} (88%)	^{187}Tl	13/2+		
^{187m1}Pb		19(10) keV			1981	18.3(3) s	α (12%)	^{183}Hg	13/2+		
^{187m2}Pb		307.9(1) keV			2022	5.15(15) μs	IT	^{187}Pb	(7/2−)		
^{188}Pb		82	106	187.980879(11)	1972	25.1(1) s	β^{+} (91.5%)	^{188}Tl	0+		
^{188}Pb		82	106	187.980879(11)	1972	25.1(1) s	α (8.5%)	^{184}Hg	0+		
^{188m1}Pb		2577.2(4) keV			1999	800(20) ns	IT	^{188}Pb	8−		
^{188m2}Pb		2709.8(5) keV			1999	94(12) ns	IT	^{188}Pb	12+		
^{188m3}Pb		4783.4(7) keV			2000	440(60) ns	IT	^{188}Pb	(19−)		
^{189}Pb		82	107	188.980844(15)	1972	39(8) s	β^{+} (99.58%)	^{189}Tl	3/2−		
^{189}Pb		82	107	188.980844(15)	1972	39(8) s	α (0.42%)	^{185}Hg	3/2−		
^{189m1}Pb		40(4) keV			2009	50.5(21) s	β^{+} (99.6%)	^{189}Tl	13/2+		
^{189m1}Pb		40(4) keV			2009	50.5(21) s	α (0.4%)	^{185}Hg	13/2+		
^{189m1}Pb		40(4) keV			2009	50.5(21) s	IT?	^{189}Pb	13/2+		
^{189m2}Pb		2475(4) keV			2005	26(5) μs	IT	^{189}Pb	31/2−		
^{190}Pb		82	108	189.978082(13)	1972	71(1) s	β^{+} (99.60%)	^{190}Tl	0+		
^{190}Pb		82	108	189.978082(13)	1972	71(1) s	α (0.40%)	^{186}Hg	0+		
^{190m1}Pb		2614.8(8) keV			1998	150(14) ns	IT	^{190}Pb	10+		
^{190m2}Pb		2665(50)# keV			1985	24.3(21) μs	IT	^{190}Pb	(12+)		
^{190m3}Pb		2658.2(8) keV			1998	7.7(3) μs	IT	^{190}Pb	11−		
^{191}Pb		82	109	190.9782165(71)	1974	1.33(8) min	β^{+} (99.49%)	^{191}Tl	3/2−		
^{191}Pb		82	109	190.9782165(71)	1974	1.33(8) min	α (0.51%)	^{187}Hg	3/2−		
^{191m1}Pb		58(10) keV			1981	2.18(8) min	β^{+} (99.98%)	^{191}Tl	13/2+		
^{191m1}Pb		58(10) keV			1981	2.18(8) min	α (0.02%)	^{187}Hg	13/2+		
^{191m2}Pb		2659(10) keV			1999	180(80) ns	IT	^{191}Pb	33/2+		
^{192}Pb		82	110	191.9757896(61)	1974	3.5(1) min	β^{+} (99.99%)	^{192}Tl	0+		
^{192}Pb		82	110	191.9757896(61)	1974	3.5(1) min	α (0.0059%)	^{188}Hg	0+		
^{192m1}Pb		2581.1(1) keV			1985	166(6) ns	IT	^{192}Pb	10+		
^{192m2}Pb		2625.1(11) keV			1979	1.09(4) μs	IT	^{192}Pb	12+		
^{192m3}Pb		2743.5(4) keV			2001	756(14) ns	IT	^{192}Pb	11−		
^{193}Pb		82	111	192.976136(11)	1974	4# min	β^{+}?	^{193}Tl	3/2−#		
^{193m1}Pb		93(12) keV			1974	5.8(2) min	β^{+}	^{193}Tl	13/2+		
^{193m2}Pb		2707(13) keV			1991	180(15) ns	IT	^{193}Pb	33/2+		
^{194}Pb		82	112	193.974012(19)	1960	10.7(6) min	β^{+}	^{194}Tl	0+		
^{194}Pb		82	112	193.974012(19)	1960	10.7(6) min	α (7.3×10^{−6}%)	^{190}Hg	0+		
^{194m1}Pb		2628.1(4) keV			1972	370(13) ns	IT	^{194}Pb	12+		
^{194m2}Pb		2933.0(4) keV			1986	133(7) ns	IT	^{194}Pb	11−		
^{195}Pb		82	113	194.9745162(55)	1957	15.0(14) min	β^{+}	^{195}Tl	3/2-		
^{195m1}Pb		202.9(7) keV			1982	15.0(12) min	β^{+}	^{195}Tl	13/2+		
^{195m1}Pb		202.9(7) keV			1982	15.0(12) min	IT?	^{195}Pb	13/2+		
^{195m2}Pb		1759.0(7) keV			1977	10.0(7) μs	IT	^{195}Pb	21/2−		
^{195m3}Pb		2901.7(8) keV			(1982) (Note: Only published in a conference proceeding and not a refereed journal)	95(20) ns	IT	^{195}Pb	33/2+		
^{196}Pb		82	114	195.9727876(83)	1957	37(3) min	β^{+}	^{196}Tl	0+		
^{196}Pb		82	114	195.9727876(83)	1957	37(3) min	α (<3×10^{−5}%)	^{192}Hg	0+		
^{196m1}Pb		1797.51(14) keV			1973	140(14) ns	IT	^{196}Pb	5−		
^{196m2}Pb		2694.6(3) keV			1973	270(4) ns	IT	^{196}Pb	12+		
^{197}Pb		82	115	196.9734347(52)	1955	8.1(17) min	β^{+}	^{197}Tl	3/2−		
^{197m1}Pb		319.31(11) keV			1957	42.9(9) min	β^{+} (81%)	^{197}Tl	13/2+		
^{197m1}Pb		319.31(11) keV			1957	42.9(9) min	IT (19%)	^{197}Pb	13/2+		
^{197m2}Pb		1914.10(25) keV			1977	1.15(20) μs	IT	^{197}Pb	21/2−		
^{198}Pb		82	116	197.9720155(94)	1955	2.4(1) h	β^{+}	^{198}Tl	0+		
^{198m1}Pb		2141.4(4) keV			1972	4.12(7) μs	IT	^{198}Pb	7−		
^{198m2}Pb		2231.4(5) keV			1973	137(10) ns	IT	^{198}Pb	9−		
^{198m3}Pb		2821.7(6) keV			1973	212(4) ns	IT	^{198}Pb	12+		
^{199}Pb		82	117	198.9729126(73)	1950	90(10) min	β^{+}	^{199}Tl	3/2−		
^{199m1}Pb		429.5(27) keV			1955	12.2(3) min	IT	^{199}Pb	(13/2+)		
^{199m1}Pb		429.5(27) keV			1955	12.2(3) min	β^{+}?	^{199}Tl	(13/2+)		
^{199m2}Pb		2563.8(27) keV			1977	10.1(2) μs	IT	^{199}Pb	(29/2−)		
^{200}Pb		82	118	199.971819(11)	1950	21.5(4) h	EC	^{200}Tl	0+		
^{200m1}Pb		2183.3(11) keV			1972	456(6) ns	IT	^{200}Pb	(9−)		
^{200m2}Pb		3005.8(12) keV			1973	198(3) ns	IT	^{200}Pb	(12+)		
^{201}Pb		82	119	200.972870(15)	1950	9.33(3) h	β^{+}	^{201}Tl	5/2−		
^{201m1}Pb		629.1(3) keV			1952	60.8(18) s	IT	^{201}Pb	13/2+		
^{201m1}Pb		629.1(3) keV			1952	60.8(18) s	β^{+}?	^{201}Tl	13/2+		
^{201m2}Pb		2953(20) keV			1981	508(3) ns	IT	^{201}Pb	(29/2−)		
^{202}Pb		82	120	201.9721516(41)	1954	5.25(28)×10^{4} y	EC	^{202}Tl	0+		
^{202m1}Pb		2169.85(8) keV			1954	3.54(2) h	IT (90.5%)	^{202}Pb	9−		
^{202m1}Pb		2169.85(8) keV			1954	3.54(2) h	β^{+} (9.5%)	^{202}Tl	9−		
^{202m2}Pb		4140(50)# keV			1986	100(3) ns	IT	^{202}Pb	16+		
^{202m3}Pb		5300(50)# keV			1987	108(3) ns	IT	^{202}Pb	19−		
^{203}Pb		82	121	202.9733906(70)	1942	51.924(15) h	EC	^{203}Tl	5/2−		
^{203m1}Pb		825.2(3) keV			1955	6.21(8) s	IT	^{203}Pb	13/2+		
^{203m2}Pb		2949.2(4) keV			1977	480(7) ms	IT	^{203}Pb	29/2−		
^{203m3}Pb		2970(50)# keV			1988	122(4) ns	IT	^{203}Pb	25/2−#		
^{204}Pb (Note: Used in lead–lead dating)		82	122	203.9730435(12)	1932	Observationally stable (Note: Believed to undergo α decay to ^{200}Hg with a half-life over 1.4×10^{20} years; the theoretical lifetime is around ~10^{35–37} years.)			0+	0.014(6)	0.0000–0.0158
^{204m1}Pb		1274.13(5) keV			1950	265(6) ns	IT	^{204}Pb	4+		
^{204m2}Pb		2185.88(8) keV			1947	66.93(10) min	IT	^{204}Pb	9−		
^{204m3}Pb		2264.42(6) keV			1978	490(70) ns	IT	^{204}Pb	7−		
^{204m4}Pb		8349 keV			2022	0.22(2) ms	IT	^{204}Pb	(22+)		
^{205}Pb		82	123	204.9744817(12)	1954	1.70(9)×10^{7} y	EC	^{205}Tl	5/2−		
^{205m1}Pb		2.329(7) keV			1976	24.2(4) μs	IT	^{205}Pb	1/2−		
^{205m2}Pb		1013.85(3) keV			1960	5.55(2) ms	IT	^{205}Pb	13/2+		
^{205m3}Pb		3195.8(6) keV			1973	217(5) ns	IT	^{205}Pb	25/2−		
^{206}Pb (Note: Final decay product of 4n+2 decay chain (the Radium or Uranium series))	Radium G	82	124	205.9744652(12)	1927	Observationally stable (Note: Believed to undergo α decay to ^{202}Hg with a half-life over 2.5×10^{21} years; the theoretical lifetime is ~10^{65–68} years.)			0+	0.241(30)	0.0190–0.8673
^{206m1}Pb		2200.16(4) keV			1953	125(2) μs	IT	^{206}Pb	7−		
^{206m2}Pb		4027.3(7) keV			1971	202(3) ns	IT	^{206}Pb	12+		
^{207}Pb (Note: Final decay product of 4n+3 decay chain (the Actinium series))	Actinium D	82	125	206.9758968(12)	1927	Observationally stable (Note: Believed to undergo α decay to ^{203}Hg with a half-life over 1.9×10^{21} years; the theoretical lifetime is ~10^{152–189} years.)			1/2−	0.221(50)	0.0035–0.2351
^{207m1}Pb		1633.356(4) keV			1954	806(5) ms	IT	^{207}Pb	13/2+		
^{207m2}Pb		8834.6(6) keV			2025	1.46(10) ms	IT	^{207}Pb	(39/2−)		
^{208}Pb (Note: Heaviest observationally stable nuclide; final decay product of 4n decay chain (the Thorium series))	Thorium D	82	126	207.9766520(12)	1927	Observationally stable (Note: Believed to undergo α decay to ^{204}Hg with a half-life over 2.6×10^{21} years; the theoretical lifetime is ~10^{124–132} years.)			0+	0.524(70)	0.0338–0.9775
^{208m}Pb		4895.23(5) keV			1989	535(35) ns	IT	^{208}Pb	10+		
^{209}Pb		82	127	208.9810900(19)	1940	3.235(5) h	β^{−}	^{209}Bi	9/2+	Trace (Note: Intermediate decay product of ^{237}Np)	
^{210}Pb	Radium D Radiolead; Radio-lead	82	128	209.9841884(16)	1900	22.20(22) y	β^{−} (100%)	^{210}Bi	0+	Trace (Note: Intermediate decay product of ^{238}U)	
^{210}Pb	Radium D Radiolead; Radio-lead	82	128	209.9841884(16)	1900	22.20(22) y	α (1.9×10^{−6}%)	^{206}Hg	0+	Trace	
^{210m1}Pb		1194.61(18) keV			2018	92(10) ns	IT	^{210}Pb	6+		
^{210m2}Pb		1274.8(3) keV			1980	201(17) ns	IT	^{210}Pb	8+		
^{211}Pb	Actinium B	82	129	210.9887353(24)	1904	36.1628(25) min	β^{−}	^{211}Bi	9/2+	Trace (Note: Intermediate decay product of ^{235}U)	
^{211m}Pb		1719(23) keV			2011	159(28) ns	IT	^{211}Pb	(27/2+)		
^{212}Pb	Thorium B	82	130	211.9918959(20)	1900	10.627(6) h	β^{−}	^{212}Bi	0+	Trace (Note: Intermediate decay product of ^{232}Th)	
^{212m}Pb		1335(2) keV			1998	6.0(8) μs	IT	^{212}Pb	8+#		
^{213}Pb		82	131	212.9965608(75)	1964	10.2(3) min	β^{−}	^{213}Bi	(9/2+)	Trace	
^{213m}Pb		1331.0(17) keV			2021	260(20) ns	IT	^{213}Pb	(21/2+)		
^{214}Pb	Radium B	82	132	213.9998035(21)	1904	27.06(7) min	β^{−}	^{214}Bi	0+	Trace	
^{214m}Pb		1420(20) keV			2012	6.2(3) μs	IT	^{214}Pb	8+#		
^{215}Pb		82	133	215.004662(57)	1998	142(11) s	β^{−}	^{215}Bi	9/2+#		
^{216}Pb		82	134	216.00806(22)#	2010	1.66(20) min	β^{−}	^{216}Bi	0+		
^{216m}Pb		1514(20) keV			2012	400(40) ns	IT	^{216}Pb	8+#		
^{217}Pb		82	135	217.01316(32)#	2010	19.9(53) s	β^{−}	^{217}Bi	9/2+#		
^{218}Pb		82	136	218.01678(32)#	2010	14.8(68) s	β^{−}	^{218}Bi	0+		
^{219}Pb		82	137	219.02214(43)#	2010	3# s [>300 ns]	β^{−}?	^{219}Bi	11/2+#		
^{220}Pb		82	138	220.02591(43)#	2010	1# s [>300 ns]	β^{−}?	^{220}Bi	0+		
This table header & footer:

== Lead-206 ==
^{206}Pb is the final step in the decay chain of ^{238}U, the "radium series" or "uranium series". In a closed system, over time, a given mass of ^{238}U will decay in a sequence of steps culminating in ^{206}Pb. The production of intermediate products eventually reaches an equilibrium (though this takes a long time, as the half-life of ^{234}U is 245,500 years). Once this stabilized system is reached, the ratio of ^{238}U to ^{206}Pb will steadily decrease, while the ratios of the other intermediate products to each other remain constant.

Like most radioisotopes found in the radium series, ^{206}Pb was initially named as a variation of radium, specifically radium G. It is the decay product of both ^{210}Po (historically called radium F) by alpha decay, and the much rarer ^{206}Tl (radium E^{II}) by beta decay.

Lead-206 has been proposed for use in fast breeder nuclear fission reactor coolant over the use of natural lead mixture (which also includes other stable lead isotopes) as a mechanism to improve neutron economy and greatly suppress unwanted production of highly radioactive byproducts.

== Lead-204, -207, and -208 ==
^{204}Pb is entirely primordial, and is thus useful for estimating the fraction of the other lead isotopes in a given sample that are also primordial, since the relative fractions of the various primordial lead isotopes is constant everywhere. Any excess lead-206, -207, and -208 is thus assumed to be radiogenic in origin, allowing various uranium and thorium dating schemes to be used to estimate the age of rocks (time since their formation) based on the relative abundance of lead-204 to other isotopes. ^{207}Pb is the end of the actinium series from ^{235}U.

^{208}Pb is the end of the thorium series from ^{232}Th. While it only makes up approximately half of the composition of lead in most places on Earth, it can be found naturally enriched up to around 90% in thorium ores. ^{208}Pb is the heaviest known stable nuclide and also the heaviest known doubly magic nucleus, as Z = 82 and N = 126 correspond to closed nuclear shells. As a consequence of this particularly stable configuration, its neutron capture cross section is very low (even lower than that of deuterium in the thermal spectrum), making it of interest for lead-cooled fast reactors.

In 2025 a published study suggested that the nucleus of ^{208}Pb is not perfectly spherical as previously believed, but rather is a "prolate spheroid", more commonly described as the shape of a rugby ball.

== Lead-210 ==
Lead-210 (^{210}Pb) is a radiogenic isotope of lead, found in the decay chain of uranium-238. It is a beta emitter with a half-life of 22.20 years. In addition to dating recent sediments, ^{210}Pb is widely applied for studying soil erosion and sedimentation dynamics in agricultural and natural environments. The unsupported or excess component (^{210}Pb_{ex}), derived from atmospheric fallout of radon-222 decay products, accumulates in surface soils and decays with a half-life of 22.3 years. Its depth-dependent activity profile enables reconstruction of soil redistribution over the past century.

Because ^{210}Pb deposition is continuous and globally widespread, the method provides a long-term perspective that complements the medium-term records obtained from anthropogenic radionuclides such as ^{137}Cs. It has been used to quantify erosion and deposition rates, assess land degradation, and evaluate soil conservation practices, offering valuable data for geomorphic and environmental research.

The radiation emitted by lead-210 can cause issues for some particle physics experiments which has resulted in the use of ancient Roman lead in such applications where the lead-210 has had time to decay to far lower levels.

== Lead-212 ==
Lead-212 (^{212}Pb) is a radioactive isotope of lead that has gained significant attention in nuclear medicine, particularly in targeted alpha therapy (TAT). This isotope is part of the thorium decay series and serves as an important intermediate in various radioactive decay chains. ^{212}Pb is produced through the decay of radon-220 (^{220}Rn), an intermediate product of thorium-228 (^{228}Th) decay. It undergoes radioactive decay through beta emission to form bismuth-212 (^{212}Bi), which further decays to emit alpha particles. This decay chain is particularly important in medical applications, as it is an in-vivo generator system of alpha particles, that can be utilized for therapeutic purposes, particularly TAT, by delivering potent, localized radiation to cancer cells.

The isotope is part of the thorium decay series, which begins with natural thorium-232. Its beta decay (10.627 hours) results in the formation of bismuth-212 (^{212}Bi), which then emits alpha particles (6.1 MeV), crucial for the effectiveness of TAT in cancer treatment.

While in aqueous solutions, free Pb^{2+} tends to hydrolyze under physiological pH conditions to form species like Pb(OH)^{+}, which can impact its biodistribution if not properly chelated, chelator-modified complexes have demonstrated high stability in saline and serum environments for extended periods (e.g., 24–72 hours), which is critical for therapeutic applications.

Lead-212 can be synthesized through several methods, with generator-based production utilizing the decay of ^{228}Th being the most common. This includes direct extraction from ^{228}Th, ^{224}Ra/^{212}Pb generators, and ^{220}Rn-based generation. Each of these methods has its own advantages and complexities. These various production routes cater to different industrial needs and regulatory considerations in the field of radioisotope production.

== See also ==
Daughter products other than lead

- Isotopes of bismuth
- Isotopes of thallium
- Isotopes of mercury
