= Bismuth-209 =

Isotope of bismuth

General
- Symbol: ^{209}Bi
- Names: bismuth-209
- Protons (Z): 83
- Neutrons (N): 126

Nuclide data
- Natural abundance: 100%
- Half-life (t_{1/2}): 2.01×10^{19} years
- Isotope mass: 208.980399 Da
- Spin: 9/2−
- Excess energy: −18258.461±2.4 keV
- Nuclear binding energy: 7847.987±1.7 keV
- Parent isotopes: ^{209}Pb (β^{−})^{209}Po (β^{+})^{213}At (α)
- Decay products: ^{205}Tl

Decay modes
- Decay mode: Decay energy (MeV)
- Alpha emission: 3.1373

Bismuth-209 (^{209}Bi) is an isotope of bismuth with the longest known half-life of any nuclide that undergoes α-decay (alpha decay); the decay product is thallium-205. It has 83 protons and a magic number of 126 neutrons, and naturally occurring bismuth consists entirely of this isotope.

== Decay properties ==
Bismuth-209 was long thought to have the heaviest stable nucleus of any element, but in 2003, a research team at the Institut d'astrophysique spatiale in Orsay, France, discovered that ^{209}Bi undergoes alpha decay with a half-life now given more precisely as 2.01×10^{19} years (20.1 quintillion years), over 10^{9} times longer than the estimated age of the universe. The heaviest nucleus considered to be stable is now lead-208 and the heaviest stable monoisotopic element is gold (gold-197).

Theory had previously predicted a half-life of 4.6×10^{19} years. It had been suspected to be radioactive for a long time. The decay produces a 3.14 MeV alpha particle plus thallium-205.

Bismuth-209 occurs in the neptunium series decay chain.

Due to its extremely long half-life, ^{209}Bi can be treated as non-radioactive for nearly all applications. It is much less radioactive than human flesh, so it poses no real radiation hazard. Though ^{209}Bi holds the half-life record for alpha decay, it does not have the longest known half-life of any nuclide; this distinction belongs to tellurium-128 (^{128}Te) with a half-life estimated at 7.7×10^{24} years by double beta decay.

The half-life of ^{209}Bi was confirmed in 2012 by an Italian team in Gran Sasso who reported (2.01±0.08)×10^{19} years. They also reported an even longer partial half-life for alpha decay of ^{209}Bi to the first excited state of ^{205}Tl (at 204 keV), estimated at 1.66×10^{21} years. Even though this value is shorter than the half-life of ^{128}Te, both alpha decays of ^{209}Bi hold the record of the thinnest natural line widths of any measurable physical excitation, estimated respectively at ΔΕ ≈ 5.5×10^{−43} eV and ΔΕ ≈ 1.3×10^{−44} eV in application of the uncertainty principle $\Delta E = \tfrac{\hbar}{2T_{1/2}}$ (beta or double beta decay would produce energy lines only in neutrinoless transitions, which have never been observed).

== Applications ==
Because all primordial bismuth is bismuth-209, bismuth-209 is used for all normal applications of bismuth, such as being used as a replacement for lead, in cosmetics, in paints, and in several medicines such as Pepto-Bismol. Alloys containing bismuth-209 such as bismuth bronze have been used for thousands of years.

=== Synthesis of other elements ===
^{210}Po can be manufactured by bombarding ^{209}Bi with neutrons in a nuclear reactor and around 100 grams of ^{210}Po are produced each year. ^{209}Po and ^{208}Po can be made through the proton bombardment of ^{209}Bi in a cyclotron. Astatine can also be produced by bombarding ^{209}Bi with alpha particles. Traces of ^{209}Bi have also been used to create gold in nuclear reactors.

^{209}Bi has been used as a target for the creation of several isotopes of superheavy elements such as dubnium, bohrium, meitnerium, roentgenium, and nihonium.

== Formation ==
=== Primordial ===
Bismuth-209 is created in the final part of the s-process. (Note: Red horizontal lines with a circle in their right ends represent neutron captures; blue arrows pointing up-left represent beta decays; green arrows pointing down-left represent alpha decays; cyan/light-green arrows pointing down-right represent electron captures.)

In the red giant stars of the asymptotic giant branch, the s-process (slow process) is ongoing to produce bismuth-209 and polonium-210 by neutron capture as the heaviest elements to be formed, and the latter quickly decays. All elements heavier than it are formed in the r-process, or rapid process, which occurs during the first fifteen minutes of supernovae. Bismuth-209 is also created during the r-process.

=== Radiogenic ===
Some ^{209}Bi was created radiogenically from the neptunium decay chain. Neptunium-237 is an extinct radionuclide, but it can be found in traces in uranium ores because of neutron capture reactions. This is also ultimately due to the r-process, as every (4n+1) nucleus formed (and not fissioned) ultimately decayed to bismuth.

== See also ==
- Isotopes of bismuth
- Primordial radionuclide
- List of elements by stability of isotopes

== Notes ==
Lighter: bismuth-208	Bismuth-209 is an isotope of bismuth	Heavier: bismuth-210
Decay product of: astatine-213 (α) polonium-209 (β^{+}) lead-209 (β^{−})	Decay chain of bismuth-209	Decays to: thallium-205 (α)
