= Uranium-238 =

Isotope of uranium

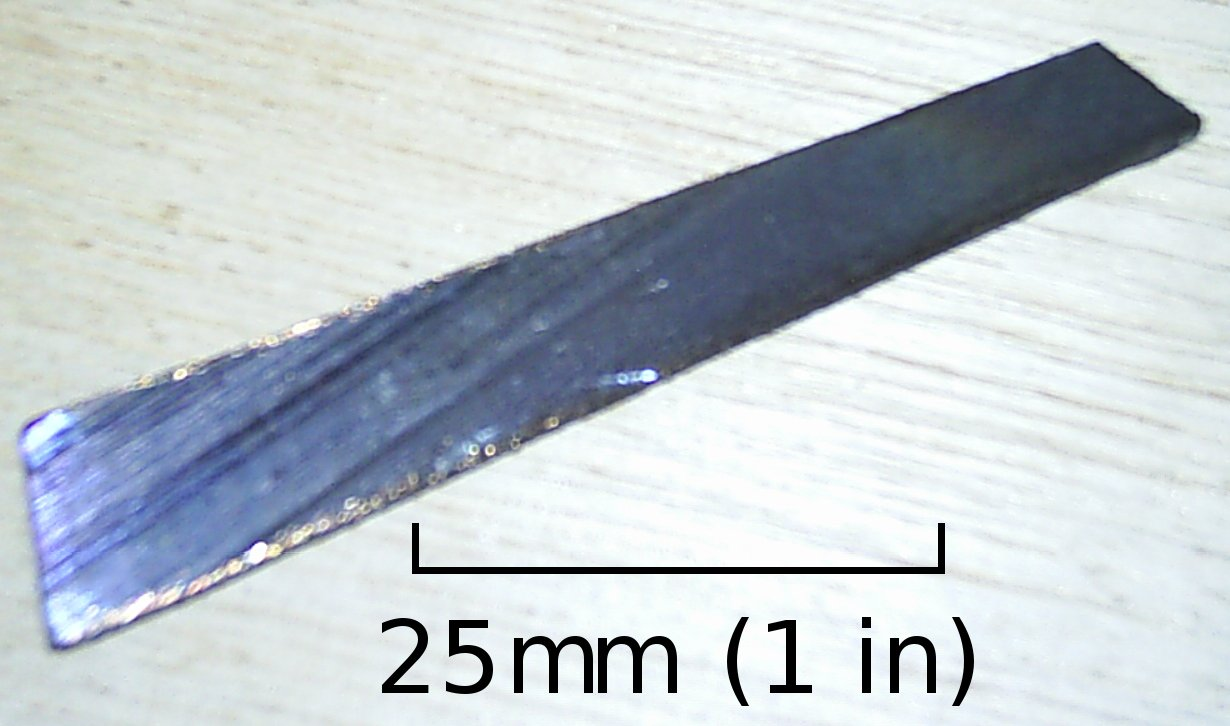
- 10-gram sample

General
- Symbol: ^{238}U
- Names: uranium-238
- Protons (Z): 92
- Neutrons (N): 146

Nuclide data
- Natural abundance: 99.274%
- Half-life (t_{1/2}): 4.463×10^{9} years
- Isotope mass: 238.050787 Da
- Spin: 0
- Parent isotopes: ^{242}Pu (α)^{238}Pa (β^{−})
- Decay products: ^{234}Th

Decay modes
- Decay mode: Decay energy (MeV)
- alpha decay: 4.270

Uranium-238 (^{238}U or U-238) is the most common isotope of uranium found in nature, with a relative abundance above 99%. Unlike uranium-235, it is non-fissile, which means it cannot sustain a chain reaction in a thermal-neutron reactor. However, it is fissionable by fast neutrons, and is fertile, meaning it can be transmuted to fissile plutonium-239. ^{238}U cannot support a chain reaction because inelastic scattering reduces neutron energy below the range where fast fission of one or more next-generation nuclei is probable. Doppler broadening of ^{238}U's neutron absorption resonances, increasing absorption as fuel temperature increases, is also an essential negative feedback mechanism for reactor control.

The isotope has a half-life of 4.463 billion years (1.408×10^{17} s). Due to its abundance and half-life relative rate of decay to other radioactive elements, ^{238}U is responsible for about 40% of the radioactive heat produced within the Earth. The ^{238}U decay chain contributes six electron anti-neutrinos per ^{238}U nucleus (one per beta decay), resulting in a large detectable geoneutrino signal when decays occur within the Earth. The decay of ^{238}U to daughter isotopes is extensively used in radiometric dating, particularly for material older than approximately 1 million years.

Depleted uranium has an even higher concentration of the ^{238}U isotope, and even low-enriched uranium (LEU), while having a higher proportion of the uranium-235 isotope (in comparison to depleted uranium), is still mostly ^{238}U. Reprocessed uranium is also mainly ^{238}U, with about as much uranium-235 as natural uranium, a comparable proportion of uranium-236, and much smaller amounts of other isotopes of uranium such as uranium-234, uranium-233, and uranium-232.

== Nuclear energy applications ==
In a fission nuclear reactor, uranium-238 can be used to generate plutonium-239, which itself can be used in a nuclear weapon or as a nuclear-reactor fuel supply. In a typical nuclear reactor, up to one-third of the generated power comes from the fission of ^{239}Pu, which is not supplied as a fuel to the reactor, but rather, produced from ^{238}U. A certain amount of production of ^{239}Pu from ^{238}U is unavoidable wherever it is exposed to neutron radiation. Depending on burnup and neutron temperature, different shares of the ^{239}Pu are converted to ^{240}Pu, which determines the "grade" of produced plutonium, ranging from weapons grade, through reactor grade, to plutonium so high in ^{240}Pu that it cannot be used in current reactors operating with a thermal neutron spectrum. The latter usually involves used "recycled" MOX fuel which entered the reactor containing significant amounts of plutonium.

=== Breeder reactors ===
^{238}U can produce energy via "fast" fission. In this process, a neutron that has a kinetic energy in excess of 1 MeV can cause the nucleus of ^{238}U to split. Depending on design, this process can contribute some one to ten percent of all fission reactions in a reactor, but too few of the average 2.5 neutrons produced in each fission have enough speed to continue a chain reaction (this is why natural uranium will not work in a bomb).

^{238}U can be used as a source material for creating plutonium-239, which can in turn be used as nuclear fuel. Breeder reactors carry out such a process of transmutation to convert the fertile isotope ^{238}U into fissile ^{239}Pu. It has been estimated that there is anywhere from 10,000 to five billion years worth of ^{238}U for use in these power plants. Breeder technology has been used in several experimental nuclear reactors.

By December 2005, the only breeder reactor producing power was the 600-megawatt BN-600 reactor at the Beloyarsk Nuclear Power Station in Russia. Russia later built another unit, BN-800, at the Beloyarsk Nuclear Power Station which became fully operational in November 2016. Also, Japan's Monju breeder reactor, which has been inoperative for most of the time since it was originally built in 1986, was ordered for decommissioning in 2016, after safety and design hazards were uncovered, with a completion date set for 2047. Both China and India have announced plans to build nuclear breeder reactors.

The breeder reactor as its name implies creates larger quantities of ^{239}Pu or ^{233}U (the fissile isotopes) than it consumes.

The Clean And Environmentally Safe Advanced Reactor (CAESAR), a nuclear reactor concept that would use steam as a moderator to control delayed neutrons, will potentially be able to use ^{238}U as fuel once the reactor is started with Low-enriched uranium (LEU) fuel. This design is still in the early stages of development.

=== CANDU reactors ===
Natural uranium, with 0.72% ^{235}U, is usable as nuclear fuel in reactors designed specifically for this, such as the heavy-water CANDU reactor. By making use of non-enriched uranium, such reactor designs give a nation access to nuclear power for the purpose of electricity production without necessitating the development of fuel enrichment capabilities, which are often seen as a prelude to weapons production.

=== Radiation shielding ===
^{238}U is also used as a radiation shield – its alpha radiation is easily stopped by the non-radioactive casing of the shielding and the uranium's high atomic weight and high number of electrons are highly effective in absorbing gamma rays and X-rays. It is not as effective as ordinary water for stopping fast neutrons. Both metallic depleted uranium and depleted uranium dioxide are used for radiation shielding. Uranium is about five times better as a gamma ray shield than lead, so a shield with the same effectiveness can be packed into a thinner layer.

DUCRETE, a concrete made with uranium dioxide aggregate instead of gravel, is being investigated as a material for dry cask storage systems to store radioactive waste.

=== Downblending ===
The opposite of enriching is downblending. Surplus highly enriched uranium can be downblended with depleted uranium or natural uranium to turn it into low-enriched uranium suitable for use in commercial nuclear fuel.

^{238}U from depleted uranium and natural uranium is also used with recycled ^{239}Pu from nuclear weapons stockpiles for making mixed oxide fuel (MOX), which is now being redirected to become fuel for nuclear reactors. This dilution, also called downblending, means that any nation or group that acquired the finished fuel would have to repeat the very expensive and complex chemical separation of uranium and plutonium process before assembling a weapon.

== Nuclear weapons ==
Most modern nuclear weapons utilize ^{238}U as a "tamper" material (see nuclear weapon design). A tamper which surrounds a fissile core works to reflect neutrons and to add inertia to the compression of the ^{239}Pu charge. As such, it increases the efficiency of the weapon and reduces the critical mass required. In the case of a thermonuclear weapon, ^{238}U can be used to encase the fusion fuel, the high flux of very energetic neutrons from the resulting fusion reaction causes ^{238}U nuclei to split and adds more energy to the "yield" of the weapon. Such weapons are referred to as fission-fusion-fission weapons after the order in which each reaction takes place. An example of such a weapon is Castle Bravo.

The larger portion of the total explosive yield in this design comes from the final fission stage fueled by ^{238}U, producing enormous amounts of radioactive fission products. For example, an estimated 77% of the 10.4-megaton yield of the Ivy Mike thermonuclear test in 1952 came from fast fission of the depleted uranium tamper. Because depleted (or natural) uranium has no critical mass, it can be added to thermonuclear bombs in almost unlimited quantity. The Soviet Union's test of the Tsar Bomba in 1961 produced "only" 50 megatons of explosive power, over 90% of which came from fusion because the ^{238}U final stage had been replaced with lead. Had ^{238}U been used instead, the yield of the Tsar Bomba could have been well above 100 megatons, and it would have produced nuclear fallout equivalent to one third of the global total that had been produced up to that time.

== Decay ==
Uranium-238 is an alpha emitter, producing thorium-234 which is a beta emitter, etc. This leads to a decay chain, commonly called the radium series or uranium series. Beginning with naturally occurring uranium-238, this series includes isotopes of astatine, bismuth, lead, polonium, protactinium, radium, radon, thallium, thorium and uranium, all of which are present in natural uranium sources. The decay proceeds as (only main decay branches shown):

$$\begin{array}{l}{}\\
\ce{^{238}_{92}U->[\alpha][4.463 \times 10^9 \ \ce y] {^{234}_{90}Th} ->[\beta^-][24.11 \ \ce d] {^{234\!m}_{91}Pa}}
\begin{Bmatrix}
\ce{->[0.16\%][1.16 \ \ce{min}] {^{234}_{91}Pa} ->[\beta^-][6.70 \ \ce h]} \\
\ce{->[99.84\%\ \beta^-][1.16 \ \ce{min}]}
\end{Bmatrix}
\ce{^{234}_{92}U ->[\alpha][2.455 \times 10^5 \ \ce y] {^{230}_{90}Th} ->[\alpha][7.54 \times 10^4 \ \ce y] {^{226}_{88}Ra} ->[\alpha][1600 \ \ce y] {^{222}_{86}Rn}}
\\
\ce{^{222}_{86}Rn ->[\alpha][3.8235 \ \ce d] {^{218}_{84}Po} ->[\alpha][3.097 \ \ce{min}] {^{214}_{82}Pb} ->[\beta^-][27.06 \ \ce{min}] {^{214}_{83}Bi} ->[\beta^-][19.9 \ \ce{min}] {^{214}_{84}Po} ->[\alpha][164.3 \ \mu\ce{s}] {^{210}_{82}Pb} ->[\beta^-][22.2 \ \ce y] {^{210}_{83}Bi} ->[\beta^-][5.012 \ \ce d] {^{210}_{84}Po} ->[\alpha][138.376 \ \ce d] {^{206}_{82}Pb}}
\end{array}$$

Or in tabular form, including minor branches:

Nuclide	Decay mode	Half-life (a = years)	Energy released MeV	Decay product
^{238}U	α	4.463×10^{9} a	4.270	^{234}Th
^{234}Th	β^{−}	24.11 d	0.195	^{234m}Pa
^{234m}Pa	IT 0.16% β^{−} 99.84%	1.16 min	0.079; 2.273	^{234}Pa^{234}U
^{234}Pa	β^{−}	6.70 h	2.194	^{234}U
^{234}U	α	2.455×10^{5} a	4.858	^{230}Th
^{230}Th	α	7.54×10^{4} a	4.770	^{226}Ra
^{226}Ra	α	1600 a	4.871	^{222}Rn
^{222}Rn	α	3.8215 d	5.590	^{218}Po
^{218}Po	α 99.98% β^{−} 0.02%	3.097 min	6.115; 0.257	^{214}Pb^{218}At
^{218}At	α 100% β^{−}	1.28 s	6.876; 2.883	^{214}Bi^{218}Rn
^{218}Rn	α	33.75 ms	7.262	^{214}Po
^{214}Pb	β^{−}	27.06 min	1.018	^{214}Bi
^{214}Bi	β^{−} 99.979% α 0.021%	19.9 min	3.269; 5.621	^{214}Po^{210}Tl
^{214}Po	α	163.5 μs	7.833	^{210}Pb
^{210}Tl	β^{−} β^{−}n 0.009%	1.30 min	5.481; 0.296	^{210}Pb^{209}Pb (in neptunium series)
^{210}Pb	β^{−} α 1.9×10^{−6}%	22.2 a	0.0635; 3.793	^{210}Bi^{206}Hg
^{210}Bi	β^{−} α 1.32×10^{−4}%	5.012 d	1.161; 5.035	^{210}Po^{206}Tl
^{210}Po	α	138.376 d	5.407	^{206}Pb
^{206}Hg	β^{−}	8.32 min	1.307	^{206}Tl
^{206}Tl	β^{−}	4.20 min	1.532	^{206}Pb
^{206}Pb	stable			

The mean lifetime of ^{238}U (or any nuclide) is the half-life divided by ln(2) ≈ 0.693 (or multiplied by 1/ln(2) ≈ 1.443), which is about 2×10^{17} seconds, so 1 mole of ^{238}U emits 3×10^{6} alpha particles per second, producing the same number of thorium-234 atoms. In a closed system an equilibrium would be reached in which all members except the stable end-product have fixed ratios to one another, but in slowly decreasing amount. The amount of ^{206}Pb will increase accordingly while that of ^{238}U decreases; all steps in the decay chain have this same rate of 3×10^{6} decayed particles per second per mole ^{238}U.

While ^{238}U is minimally radioactive, its decay products, thorium-234 and protactinium-234, are beta particle emitters with half-lives of about 20 days and one minute respectively. Protactinium-234 decays to uranium-234, which has a half-life of hundreds of millennia, and this isotope does not reach an equilibrium concentration for a very long time. When the two first isotopes in the decay chain reach their relatively small equilibrium concentrations, a sample of initially pure ^{238}U will emit three times the radiation due to ^{238}U itself, and most of this radiation is beta particles.

As already touched upon above, when starting with pure ^{238}U, within a human timescale the equilibrium applies for the first three steps in the decay chain only. Thus, for one mole of ^{238}U, 3×10^{6} times per second one alpha and two beta particles and a gamma ray are produced, together 6.7 MeV, for a rate of 3 μW.

The ^{238}U atom is itself a gamma emitter at 49.55 keV with probability 0.084%, but that is a very weak gamma line, so activity is measured through its daughter nuclides in its decay series.

== Radioactive dating ==
^{238}U abundance and its decay to daughter isotopes comprises multiple uranium dating techniques and is one of the most common radioactive isotopes used in radiometric dating. The most common dating method is uranium-lead dating, which is used to date rocks older than 1 million years old and has provided ages for the oldest rocks on Earth at 4.4 billion years old.

The relation between ^{238}U and ^{234}U gives an indication of the age of sediments and seawater that are between 100,000 years and 1,200,000 years in age.

The ^{238}U daughter product, ^{206}Pb, is an integral part of lead–lead dating, which is most famous for the determination of the age of the Earth.

The Voyager program spacecraft carry small amounts of initially pure ^{238}U on the covers of the Voyager Golden Records to facilitate dating in the same manner.

== Health concerns ==
Uranium emits alpha radiation, so external exposure has limited effect. Significant internal exposure to tiny particles of uranium or its decay products, such as thorium-230, radium-226 and radon-222, can cause severe health effects, such as cancer of the bone or liver.

Uranium is also chemically toxic, meaning that ingestion of uranium can cause kidney damage from its chemical properties much sooner than its radioactive properties would cause cancers of the bone or liver.

== See also ==
- Depleted uranium
- Uranium-lead dating

Lighter: uranium-237	Uranium-238 is an isotope of uranium	Heavier: uranium-239
Decay product of: plutonium-242 (α) protactinium-238 (β^{−})	Decay chain of uranium-238	Decays to: thorium-234 (α)
