= Decay product =

Remaining nuclide left over from radioactive decay

In nuclear physics, a decay product (also known as a daughter product, daughter isotope, radio-daughter, or daughter nuclide) is the remaining nuclide left over from radioactive decay. Radioactive decay often proceeds via a sequence of steps (decay chain). For example, ^{238}U decays to ^{234}Th which decays to ^{234m}Pa which decays, and so on, to ^{206}Pb (which is stable):

$$\ce{^{238}U ->} \overbrace{ \underbrace\ce{^{234}Th}_\ce{daughter~of~^{238}U} \ce{->} \underbrace\ce{^{234\!m}Pa}_\ce{granddaughter~of~^{238}U} \ce{-> \cdots -> {^{206}Pb} }}^\ce{decay~products~of~^{238}U}$$

The decay chain from lead-212 down to lead-208, showing the intermediate decay products

In this example:

- ^{234}Th, ^{234m}Pa,...,^{206}Pb are the decay products of ^{238}U.
- ^{234}Th is the daughter of the parent ^{238}U.
- ^{234m}Pa (234 metastable) is the granddaughter of ^{238}U.

These might also be referred to as the daughter products of ^{238}U.

Decay products are important in understanding radioactive decay and the management of radioactive waste.

For elements above lead in atomic number, the decay chain typically ends with an isotope of lead or bismuth. Bismuth itself decays to thallium, but the decay is so slow as to be practically negligible.

In many cases, individual members of the decay chain are as radioactive as the parent, but far smaller in volume/mass. Thus, although uranium is not dangerously radioactive when pure, some pieces of naturally occurring pitchblende are quite dangerous owing to their radium-226 content, which is soluble and not a ceramic like the parent. Similarly, thorium gas mantles are very slightly radioactive when new, but become more radioactive after only a few months of storage as the daughters of ^{232}Th build up.

Although it cannot be predicted whether any given atom of a radioactive substance will decay at any given time, the decay products of a radioactive substance are extremely predictable. Because of this, decay products are important to scientists in many fields who need to know the quantity or type of the parent product. Such studies are done to measure pollution levels (in and around nuclear facilities) and for other matters.

== See also ==
- Decay chain
