= Francium =

Francium, _{87}Fr
Francium
- Pronunciation: /ˈfrænsiəm/ (FRAN-see-əm)
- Mass number: [223]

Francium in the periodic table
Hydrogen																															Helium
Lithium	Beryllium																									Boron	Carbon	Nitrogen	Oxygen	Fluorine	Neon
Sodium	Magnesium																									Aluminium	Silicon	Phosphorus	Sulfur	Chlorine	Argon
Potassium	Calcium															Scandium	Titanium	Vanadium	Chromium	Manganese	Iron	Cobalt	Nickel	Copper	Zinc	Gallium	Germanium	Arsenic	Selenium	Bromine	Krypton
Rubidium	Strontium															Yttrium	Zirconium	Niobium	Molybdenum	Technetium	Ruthenium	Rhodium	Palladium	Silver	Cadmium	Indium	Tin	Antimony	Tellurium	Iodine	Xenon
Caesium	Barium	Lanthanum	Cerium	Praseodymium	Neodymium	Promethium	Samarium	Europium	Gadolinium	Terbium	Dysprosium	Holmium	Erbium	Thulium	Ytterbium	Lutetium	Hafnium	Tantalum	Tungsten	Rhenium	Osmium	Iridium	Platinum	Gold	Mercury (element)	Thallium	Lead	Bismuth	Polonium	Astatine	Radon
Francium	Radium	Actinium	Thorium	Protactinium	Uranium	Neptunium	Plutonium	Americium	Curium	Berkelium	Californium	Einsteinium	Fermium	Mendelevium	Nobelium	Lawrencium	Rutherfordium	Dubnium	Seaborgium	Bohrium	Hassium	Meitnerium	Darmstadtium	Roentgenium	Copernicium	Nihonium	Flerovium	Moscovium	Livermorium	Tennessine	Oganesson
Cs
↑
Fr
↓
(Uue)
radon ← francium → radium
- Atomic number (Z): 87
- Group: group 1: hydrogen and alkali metals
- Period: period 7
- Block: s-block
- Electron configuration: [Rn] 7s^{1}
- Electrons per shell: 2, 8, 18, 32, 18, 8, 1

Physical properties
- Phase at STP: solid
- Melting point: 300 K (27 °C, 81 °F)
- Density (near r.t.): 2.458 g/cm^{3} (estimated)
Vapor pressure (extrapolated)
P (Pa)	1	10	100	1 k	10 k	100 k
at T (K)	404	454	519	608	738	946

Atomic properties
- Oxidation states: common: +1
- Electronegativity: Pauling scale: >0.79
- Ionization energies: 1st: 393 kJ/mol
- Covalent radius: 260 pm (extrapolated)
- Van der Waals radius: 348 pm (extrapolated)

Other properties
- Natural occurrence: from decay
- Crystal structure: body-centered cubic (bcc) (extrapolated)
- Lattice constant: a = 670.4 pm (estimated)
- Thermal conductivity: 15 W/(m⋅K) (extrapolated)
- Electrical resistivity: 3 µΩ⋅m (calculated)
- Magnetic ordering: Paramagnetic
- CAS Number: 7440-73-5

History
- Naming: after France, homeland of the discoverer
- Discovery and first isolation: Marguerite Perey (1939)

Isotopes of francium
Main isotopes			Decay	
Isotope	abundance	half-life (t_{1/2})	mode	product
^{212}Fr	synth	20.0 min	β^{+}	^{212}Rn
^{212}Fr	synth	20.0 min	α	^{208}At
^{221}Fr	trace	4.801 min	α	^{217}At
^{221}Fr	trace	4.801 min	β^{−}	^{221}Ra
^{222}Fr	synth	14.2 min	β^{−}	^{222}Ra
^{223}Fr	trace	22.00 min	β^{−}	^{223}Ra
^{223}Fr	trace	22.00 min	α	^{219}At

Francium is a chemical element; it has symbol Fr and atomic number 87. It is extremely radioactive; its most stable isotope, francium-223 (originally called actinium K after the natural decay chain in which it appears), has a half-life of only 22 minutes. It is the second-most electropositive element, behind only caesium, and is the second rarest naturally occurring element (after astatine). Francium's isotopes decay quickly into astatine, radium, and radon. The electronic structure of a francium atom is [Rn] 7s^{1}; thus, the element is classed as an alkali metal.

As a consequence of its extreme instability, bulk francium has never been seen. Because of the general appearance of the other elements in its periodic table column, it is presumed that francium would appear as a highly reactive metal if enough could be collected together to be viewed as a bulk solid or liquid. Obtaining such a sample is highly improbable since the extreme heat of decay resulting from its short half-life would immediately vaporize any viewable quantity of the element.

Francium was discovered by Marguerite Perey in France (from which the element takes its name) on January 7, 1939. Before its discovery, francium was referred to as eka-caesium or ekacaesium because of its conjectured existence below caesium in the periodic table. It was the last element first discovered in nature, rather than by synthesis. (Note: Some synthetic elements, like technetium and plutonium, have later been found in nature.) Outside the laboratory, francium is extremely rare, with trace amounts found in uranium ores, where the isotope francium-223 (in the family of uranium-235) continually forms and decays. As little as 1 ounce (28 g) exists at any given time throughout the Earth's crust; aside from francium-223 and francium-221, its other isotopes are entirely synthetic. The largest amount produced in the laboratory was a cluster of more than 300,000 atoms.

== Characteristics ==
Francium is one of the most unstable of the naturally occurring elements: its longest-lived isotope, francium-223, has a half-life of only 22 minutes. The only comparable element is astatine, whose most stable natural isotope, astatine-219 (the alpha daughter of francium-223), has a half-life of 56 seconds, although synthetic astatine-210 is much longer-lived with a half-life of 8.1 hours. All isotopes of francium decay into astatine, radium, or radon. Francium-223 also has a shorter half-life than the longest-lived isotope known of each element up to and including element 105, dubnium.

Francium is an alkali metal whose chemical properties mostly resemble those of caesium. A heavy element with a single valence electron, it has the highest equivalent weight of any element. Liquid francium—if created—should have a surface tension of 0.05092 N/m at its melting point. Francium's melting point was estimated to be around 8.0 °C (46.4 °F); a value of 27 °C (81 °F) is also often encountered. The melting point is uncertain because of the element's extreme rarity and radioactivity; a different extrapolation based on Dmitri Mendeleev's method gave 20 ± 1.5 °C (68.0 ± 2.7 °F). A calculation based on the melting temperatures of binary ionic crystals gives 24.861 ± 0.517 °C (76.750 ± 0.931 °F). The estimated boiling point of 620 °C (1,148 °F) is also uncertain; the estimates 598 °C (1,108 °F) and 677 °C (1,251 °F), as well as the extrapolation from Mendeleev's method of 640 °C (1,184 °F), have also been suggested. The density of francium is expected to be around 2.48 g/cm^{3} (Mendeleev's method extrapolates 2.4 g/cm^{3}). Another calculation gives a much higher value of 3.57 g/cm^{3}. Francium is predicted to have a bulk modulus of 2.1–2.6 GPa.

Linus Pauling estimated the electronegativity of francium at 0.7 on the Pauling scale, the same as caesium; the value for caesium has since been refined to 0.79, but there are no experimental data to allow a refinement of the value for francium. Francium has a slightly higher ionization energy than caesium, 392.811(4) kJ/mol as opposed to 375.7041(2) kJ/mol for caesium, as would be expected from relativistic effects, and this would imply that caesium is the less electronegative of the two. Francium should also have a higher electron affinity than caesium and the Fr^{−} ion should be more polarizable than the Cs^{−} ion.

== Compounds ==
As a result of francium's instability, its salts are only known to a small extent. Francium coprecipitates with several caesium salts, such as caesium perchlorate, which results in small amounts of francium perchlorate. This coprecipitation can be used to isolate francium, by adapting the radiocaesium coprecipitation method of Lawrence E. Glendenin and C. M. Nelson. It will additionally coprecipitate with many other caesium salts, including the iodate, the picrate, the tartrate (also rubidium tartrate), the chloroplatinate, and the silicotungstate. It also coprecipitates with silicotungstic acid, and with perchloric acid, without another alkali metal as a carrier, which leads to other methods of separation.

=== Francium perchlorate ===
Francium perchlorate is produced by the reaction of francium chloride and sodium perchlorate. The francium perchlorate coprecipitates with caesium perchlorate. This coprecipitation can be used to isolate francium, by adapting the radiocaesium coprecipitation method of Lawrence E. Glendenin and C. M. Nelson. However, this method is unreliable in separating thallium, which also coprecipitates with caesium. Francium perchlorate's entropy is expected to be 42.7 e.u (178.7 J mol^{−1} K^{−1}).

=== Francium halides ===
Francium halides are all soluble in water and are expected to be white solids. They are expected to be produced by reaction with the corresponding halogens. For example, francium chloride would be produced by the reaction of francium and chlorine, or by reaction with hydrochloric acid. Francium chloride has been studied as a pathway to separate francium from other elements, by using the high vapour pressure of the compound, although francium fluoride would have a higher vapour pressure.

=== Other compounds ===
Francium nitrate, sulfate, hydroxide, carbonate, acetate, and oxalate, are all soluble in water, while the iodate, picrate, tartrate, chloroplatinate, and silicotungstate are insoluble. The insolubility of these compounds are used to extract francium from other radioactive products, such as zirconium, niobium, molybdenum, tin, antimony, the method mentioned in the section above. Francium oxide is believed to disproportionate to the peroxide and francium metal. The CsFr molecule is predicted to have the heavier element (francium) at the negative end of the dipole, unlike all known heterodiatomic alkali metal molecules. Francium superoxide (FrO_{2}) is expected to have a more covalent character than its lighter congeners; this is attributed to the 6p electrons in francium being more involved in the francium–oxygen bonding. The relativistic destabilisation of the 6p_{3/2} spinor may make francium compounds in oxidation states higher than +1 possible, such as [Fr^{V}F_{6}]^{−}; but this has not been experimentally confirmed.

== Isotopes ==
There are 37 known isotopes of francium ranging in atomic mass from 197 to 233. Francium has seven metastable nuclear isomers. Francium-223 and francium-221 are the only isotopes that occur in nature, with the former being far more common.

Francium-223 is the most stable isotope, with a half-life of 21.8 minutes, and it is highly unlikely that an isotope of francium with a longer half-life will ever be discovered or synthesized. Francium-223 is a fifth product of the uranium-235 decay series as a daughter isotope of actinium-227; thorium-227 is the more common daughter. Francium-223 then decays into radium-223 by beta decay (1.149 MeV decay energy), with a minor (0.006%) alpha decay path to astatine-219 (5.4 MeV decay energy).

Francium-221 has a half-life of 4.8 minutes. It is the ninth product of the neptunium decay series as a daughter isotope of actinium-225. Francium-221 then decays into astatine-217 by alpha decay (6.457 MeV decay energy). Although all primordial ^{237}Np is extinct, the neptunium decay series continues to exist naturally in tiny traces due to (n,2n) knockout reactions in natural ^{238}U. Francium-222, with a half-life of 14 minutes, may be produced as a result of the beta decay of natural radon-222; this process has nonetheless not yet been observed, and it is unknown whether this process is energetically possible. (Note: AME2020 gives ^{222}Rn a lower mass than ^{222}Fr, which would forbid single beta decay, though it is possible within the given error margin and is explicitly predicted by Belli et al.)

The least stable ground state isotope is francium-215, with a half-life of 90 ns: it undergoes a 9.54 MeV alpha decay to astatine-211.

== Applications ==
Due to its instability and rarity, there are no commercial applications for francium. It has been used for research purposes in the fields of chemistry and of atomic structure. Its use as a potential diagnostic aid for various cancers has also been explored, but this application has been deemed impractical.

Francium's ability to be synthesized, trapped, and cooled, along with its relatively simple atomic structure, has made it the subject of specialized spectroscopy experiments. These experiments have led to more specific information regarding energy levels and the coupling constants between subatomic particles. Studies on the light emitted by laser-trapped francium-210 ions have provided accurate data on transitions between atomic energy levels which are fairly similar to those predicted by quantum theory. Francium is a prospective candidate for searching for CP violation.

== History ==
As early as 1870, chemists thought that there should be an alkali metal beyond caesium. It was then referred to by the provisional name eka-caesium.

=== Erroneous and incomplete discoveries ===
In 1914, Stefan Meyer, Viktor F. Hess, and Friedrich Paneth (working in Vienna) made measurements of alpha radiation from various substances, including ^{227}Ac. They observed the possibility of a minor alpha branch of this nuclide, though follow-up work could not be done due to the outbreak of World War I. Their observations were not precise and sure enough for them to announce the discovery of element 87, though it is likely that they did indeed observe the decay of ^{227}Ac to ^{223}Fr.

Soviet chemist Dmitry Dobroserdov was the first scientist to claim to have found eka-caesium, or francium. In 1925, he observed weak radioactivity in a sample of potassium, another alkali metal, and incorrectly concluded that eka-caesium was contaminating the sample (the radioactivity from the sample was from the naturally occurring potassium radioisotope, potassium-40). He then published a thesis on his predictions of the properties of eka-caesium, in which he named the element russium after his home country. Shortly thereafter, Dobroserdov began to focus on his teaching career at the Polytechnic Institute of Odesa, and he did not pursue the element further.

The following year, English chemists Gerald J. F. Druce and Frederick H. Loring analyzed X-ray photographs of manganese(II) sulfate. They observed spectral lines which they presumed to be of eka-caesium. They announced their discovery of element 87 and proposed the name alkalinium, as it would be the heaviest alkali metal.

In 1930, Fred Allison of the Alabama Polytechnic Institute claimed to have discovered element 87 (in addition to 85) when analyzing pollucite and lepidolite using his magneto-optical machine. Allison requested that it be named virginium after his home state of Virginia, along with the symbols Vi and Vm. In 1934, H.G. MacPherson of UC Berkeley disproved the effectiveness of Allison's device and the validity of his discovery.

In 1936, Romanian physicist Horia Hulubei and his French colleague Yvette Cauchois also analyzed pollucite, this time using their high-resolution X-ray apparatus. They observed several weak emission lines, which they presumed to be those of element 87. Hulubei and Cauchois reported their discovery and proposed the name moldavium, along with the symbol Ml, after Moldavia, the Romanian province where Hulubei was born. In 1937, Hulubei's work was criticized by American physicist F. H. Hirsh Jr., who rejected Hulubei's research methods. Hirsh was certain that eka-caesium would not be found in nature, and that Hulubei had instead observed mercury or bismuth X-ray lines. Hulubei insisted that his X-ray apparatus and methods were too accurate to make such a mistake. Because of this, Jean Baptiste Perrin, Nobel Prize winner and Hulubei's mentor, endorsed moldavium as the true eka-caesium over Marguerite Perey's recently discovered francium. Perey took pains to be accurate and detailed in her criticism of Hulubei's work, and finally she was credited as the sole discoverer of element 87. All other previous purported discoveries of element 87 were ruled out due to francium's very limited half-life.

=== Perey's analysis ===
Eka-caesium was discovered on January 7, 1939, by Marguerite Perey of the Curie Institute in Paris, when she purified a sample of actinium-227 which had been reported to have a decay energy of 220 keV. Perey noticed decay particles with an energy level below 80 keV. Perey thought this decay activity might have been caused by a previously unidentified decay product, one which was separated during purification, but emerged again out of the pure actinium-227. Various tests eliminated the possibility of the unknown element being thorium, radium, lead, bismuth, or thallium. The new product exhibited chemical properties of an alkali metal (such as coprecipitating with caesium salts), which led Perey to believe that it was element 87, produced by the alpha decay of actinium-227. Perey then attempted to determine the proportion of beta decay to alpha decay in actinium-227. Her first test put the alpha branching at 0.6%, a figure which she later revised to 1%.

Perey named the new isotope actinium-K (it is now referred to as francium-223) and in 1946, she proposed the name catium (Cm) for her newly discovered element, as she believed it to be the most electropositive cation of the elements. Irène Joliot-Curie, one of Perey's supervisors, opposed the name due to its connotation of cat rather than cation; furthermore, the symbol coincided with that which had since been assigned to curium. Perey then suggested francium, after France. This name was officially adopted by the International Union of Pure and Applied Chemistry (IUPAC) in 1949, becoming the second element after gallium to be named after France. It was assigned the symbol Fa, but it was revised to the current Fr shortly thereafter. Francium was the last element discovered in nature, rather than synthesized, following hafnium and rhenium. Further research into francium's structure was carried out by, among others, Sylvain Lieberman and his team at CERN in the 1970s and 1980s.

== Occurrence ==
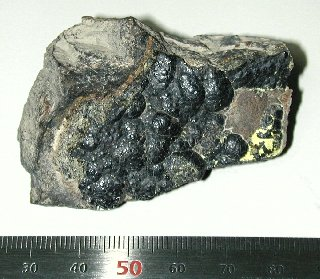
This sample of uraninite contains about 100,000 atoms (3.7×10^{−17} g) of francium-223 at any given time.

^{223}Fr is the result of the alpha decay of ^{227}Ac and can be found in trace amounts in uranium minerals. In a given sample of uranium, there is estimated to be only one francium atom for every 1 × 10^{18} uranium atoms. Only about 1 ounce (28 g) of francium is present naturally in the earth's crust.

== Production ==
A magneto-optical trap, which can hold neutral francium atoms for short periods of time.

Francium can be synthesized by a fusion reaction when a gold-197 target is bombarded with a beam of oxygen-18 atoms from a linear accelerator in a process originally developed at the physics department of the State University of New York at Stony Brook in 1995. Depending on the energy of the oxygen beam, the reaction can yield francium isotopes with masses of 209, 210, and 211.

^{197}Au + ^{18}O → ^{209}Fr + 6 n
^{197}Au + ^{18}O → ^{210}Fr + 5 n
^{197}Au + ^{18}O → ^{211}Fr + 4 n

Image of light emitted by a sample of 200,000 francium atoms in a magneto-optical trap

Heat image of 200,000 francium atoms in a magneto-optical trap, around 100 attograms

The francium atoms leave the gold target as ions, which are neutralized by collision with yttrium and then isolated in a magneto-optical trap (MOT) in a gaseous unconsolidated state. Although the atoms only remain in the trap for about 30 seconds before escaping or undergoing nuclear decay, the process supplies a continual stream of fresh atoms. The result is a steady state containing a fairly constant number of atoms for a much longer time. The original apparatus could trap up to a few thousand atoms, while a later improved design could trap over 300,000 at a time. Sensitive measurements of the light emitted and absorbed by the trapped atoms provided the first experimental results on various transitions between atomic energy levels in francium. Initial measurements show very good agreement between experimental values and calculations based on quantum theory. The research project using this production method relocated to TRIUMF in 2012, where over 10^{6} francium atoms have been held at a time, including large amounts of ^{209}Fr in addition to ^{207}Fr and ^{221}Fr.

Other synthesis methods include bombarding radium with neutrons, and bombarding thorium with protons, deuterons, or helium ions.

^{223}Fr can also be isolated from samples of its parent ^{227}Ac, the francium being milked via elution with NH_{4}Cl–CrO_{3} from an actinium-containing cation exchanger and purified by passing the solution through a silicon dioxide compound loaded with barium sulfate.

In 1996, the Stony Brook group trapped 3000 atoms in their MOT, which was enough for a video camera to capture the light given off by the atoms as they fluoresce. Francium has not been synthesized in amounts large enough to weigh.
