= Decay chain =

Series of radioactive decays

In nuclear science a decay chain refers to the predictable series of radioactive disintegrations undergone by the nuclei of certain unstable chemical elements.

Radioactive isotopes do not usually decay directly to stable isotopes, but rather into another radioisotope. The isotope produced by this radioactive emission then decays into another, often radioactive isotope. This chain of decays always terminates in a stable isotope, whose nucleus no longer has the surplus of energy necessary to produce another emission of radiation. Such stable isotopes are then said to have reached their ground states.

The stages or steps in a decay chain are referred to by their relationship to previous or subsequent stages. Hence, a parent isotope is one that undergoes decay to form a daughter isotope. For example, element 92, uranium, has an isotope with 144 neutrons (^{236}U) and it decays into an isotope of element 90, thorium, with 142 neutrons (^{232}Th). The daughter isotope may be stable or it may itself decay to form another daughter isotope. ^{232}Th does this when it decays into radium-228. The daughter of a daughter isotope, such as ^{228}Ra, is sometimes called a granddaughter isotope. ^{228}Ra in turn undergoes a further eight decays and transmutations until a stable isotope, ^{208}Pb, is produced, terminating the decay chain of ^{236}U.

The time required for an atom of a parent isotope to decay into its daughter is fundamentally unpredictable and varies widely. For individual nuclei, the process is not known to have determinable causes and the time at which it occurs is therefore completely random. The only prediction that can be made is statistical and expresses an average rate of decay. This rate can be represented by adjusting the curve of a decaying exponential distribution with a decay constant (λ) particular to the isotope. On this understanding, the radioactive decay of an initial population of unstable atoms over time t follows the curve given by e^{−λt}.

One of the most important properties of any radioactive material follows from this analysis, its half-life. This refers to the time required for half of a given number of radioactive atoms to decay and is inversely related to the isotope's decay constant, λ. Half-lives have been determined in laboratories for many radionuclides, and can range from nearly instantaneous—hydrogen-5 decays in less time than it takes for a photon to go from one end of its nucleus to the other—to fourteen orders of magnitude longer than the age of the universe: tellurium-128 has a half-life of 2.2×10^{24} years.

Quantity calculation with the Bateman-Function for ^{241}Pu

The Bateman equation predicts the relative quantities of all the isotopes that compose a given decay chain once that decay chain has proceeded long enough for some of its daughter products to have reached the stable (i.e., nonradioactive) end of the chain. A decay chain that has reached this state, which may require billions of years, is said to be in equilibrium. A sample of radioactive material in equilibrium produces a steady and steadily decreasing quantity of radioactivity as the isotopes that compose it traverse the decay chain. On the other hand, if a sample of radioactive material has been isotopically enriched, meaning that a radioisotope is present in larger quantities than would exist if a decay chain were the only cause of its presence, that sample is said to be out of equilibrium. An unintuitive consequence of this disequilibrium is that a sample of enriched material may occasionally increase in radioactivity as daughter products that are more highly radioactive than their parents accumulate. Both enriched and depleted uranium provide examples of this phenomenon.

== History ==
The chemical elements came into being in two phases. The first commenced shortly after the Big Bang. From ten seconds to 20 minutes after the beginning of the universe, the earliest condensation of light atoms was responsible for the manufacture of the four lightest elements. The vast majority of this primordial production consisted of the three lightest isotopes of hydrogen—protium, deuterium and tritium—and two of the nine known isotopes of helium—helium-3 and helium-4. Trace amounts of lithium-7 and beryllium-7 were likely also produced.

So far as is known, all heavier elements came into being starting around 100 million years later, in a second phase of nucleosynthesis that commenced with the birth of the first stars. The nuclear furnaces that power stellar evolution were necessary to create large quantities of all elements heavier than helium, and the r- and s-processes of neutron capture that occur in stellar cores are thought to have created all such elements up to iron and nickel (atomic numbers 26 and 28). The extreme conditions that attend supernovae explosions are capable of creating the elements between oxygen and rubidium (i.e., atomic numbers 8 through 37). The creation of heavier elements, including those without stable isotopes—all elements with atomic numbers greater than lead's, 82—appears to rely on r-process nucleosynthesis operating amid the immense concentrations of free neutrons released during neutron star mergers.

Most of the isotopes of each chemical element present in the Earth today were formed by such processes no later than the time of our planet's condensation from the solar protoplanetary disc, around 4.5 billion years ago. The exceptions to these so-called primordial elements are those that have resulted from the radioactive disintegration of unstable parent nuclei as they progress down one of several decay chains, each of which terminates with the production of one of the 251 stable isotopes known to exist. Aside from cosmic or stellar nucleosynthesis, and decay chains the only other ways of producing a chemical element rely on atomic weapons, nuclear reactors (natural or manmade) or the laborious atom-by-atom assembly of nuclei with particle accelerators.

Unstable isotopes decay to their daughter products (which may sometimes be even more unstable) at a given rate; eventually, often after a series of decays, a stable isotope is reached: there are 251 stable isotopes in the universe. In stable isotopes, light elements typically have a lower ratio of neutrons to protons in their nucleus than heavier elements. Light elements such as helium-4 have close to a 1:1 neutron:proton ratio. The heaviest elements such as uranium have close to 1.5 neutrons per proton (e.g. 1.587 in uranium-238). No nuclide heavier than lead-208 is stable; these heavier elements have to shed mass to achieve stability, mostly by alpha decay. The other common way for isotopes with a high neutron to proton ratio (n/p) to decay is beta decay, in which the nuclide changes elemental identity while keeping the same mass number and lowering its n/p ratio. For some isotopes with a relatively low n/p ratio, there is an inverse beta decay, by which a proton is transformed into a neutron, thus moving towards a stable isotope; however, since fission almost always produces products that are neutron heavy, positron emission or electron capture are rare compared to electron emission. There are many relatively short beta decay chains, at least two (a heavy, beta decay and a light, positron decay) for every discrete weight up to around 207 and some beyond, but for the higher mass elements (isotopes heavier than lead) there are only four pathways that encompass all decay chains. This is because there are just two main decay methods: alpha radiation, which reduces the mass number by 4, and beta, which leaves it unchanged. The four paths are termed 4n, 4n + 1, 4n + 2, and 4n + 3; the remainder from dividing the atomic mass by four gives the chain the isotope will follow in its decay. There are other decay modes, but they invariably occur at a lower probability than alpha or beta decay. (It should not be supposed that these chains have no branches: the diagram below shows a few branches of chains, and in reality there are many more, because there are many more isotopes possible than are shown in the diagram.) For example, the third atom of nihonium-278 synthesised underwent six alpha decays down to mendelevium-254, followed by an electron capture (a form of beta decay) to fermium-254, and then a seventh alpha to californium-250, upon which it would have followed the 4n + 2 chain (radium series) as given in this article. However, the heaviest superheavy nuclides synthesised do not reach the four decay chains, because they reach a spontaneously fissioning nuclide after a few alpha decays that terminates the chain: this is what happened to the first two atoms of nihonium-278 synthesised, as well as to all heavier nuclides produced.

Three of those chains have a long-lived isotope (or nuclide) near the top; this long-lived nuclide is a bottleneck in the process through which the chain flows very slowly, and keeps the chain below them "alive" with flow. The three long-lived nuclides are uranium-238 (half-life 4.463 billion years), uranium-235 (half-life 704 million years) and thorium-232 (half-life 14.1 billion years). The fourth chain has no such long-lasting bottleneck nuclide near the top, so that chain has long since decayed down to the last before the end: bismuth-209. This nuclide was long thought to be stable, but in 2003 it was found to be unstable, with a very long half-life of 20.1 billion billion years; it is the last step in the chain before stable thallium-205. Because this bottleneck is so long-lived, very small quantities of the final decay product have been produced, and for most practical purposes bismuth-209 is the final decay product.

In the past, during the first few million years of the history of the Solar System, there were more unstable high-mass nuclides in existence, and the four chains were longer, as they included nuclides that have since decayed away. Notably, ^{244}Pu, ^{237}Np, and ^{247}Cm have half-lives over a million years and would have then been bottlenecks higher in the 4n, 4n+1, and 4n+3 chains respectively - ^{244}Pu and ^{247}Cm have been identified as having been present. (There is no nuclide with a half-life over a million years above ^{238}U in the 4n+2 chain.) Today some of these formerly extinct isotopes are again in existence as they have been manufactured. Thus, they again take their places in the chain: plutonium-239, used in nuclear weapons, is the major example, decaying to uranium-235 via alpha emission with a half-life 24,500 years. There has also been large-scale production of neptunium-237, resurrecting the extinct fourth chain. The tables below hence start the four decay chains at isotopes of californium with mass numbers from 249 to 252.

Summary of the four decay chain pathways
Name of series	Thorium	Neptunium	Uranium (or radium)	Actinium
Mass numbers	4n	4n+1	4n+2	4n+3
Long-lived nuclide	^{232}Th (^{244}Pu)	^{209}Bi (^{237}Np)	^{238}U	^{235}U (^{247}Cm)
Half-life (billions of years)	14.1 (0.0813)	20100000000 (0.002144)	4.463	0.704 (0.0156)
End of chain	^{208}Pb	^{205}Tl	^{206}Pb	^{207}Pb

These four chains are summarised in the chart in the following section.

== Types of decay ==
This diagram illustrates the four decay chains discussed in the text: thorium (4n, in blue), neptunium (4n+1, in pink), radium (4n+2, in red) and actinium (4n+3, in green).

The four most common modes of radioactive decay are: alpha decay, beta decay, inverse beta decay (considered as both positron emission and electron capture), and isomeric transition. Of these decay processes, only alpha decay (fission of a helium-4 nucleus) changes the atomic mass number (A) of the nucleus, and always decreases it by four. Because of this, almost any decay will result in a nucleus whose atomic mass number has the same residue mod 4. This divides the list of nuclides into four classes, each of which forms a main decay chain.

Three of these are readily observed in nature, commonly called the thorium series, the radium or uranium series, and the actinium series, representing three of these four classes, and ending in three different, stable isotopes of lead. The mass number of every isotope in the chain can be represented as A = 4n, A = 4n + 2, or A = 4n + 3, respectively. The long-lived starting isotopes of these three isotopes, respectively thorium-232, uranium-238, and uranium-235, have existed since the formation of the Earth, ignoring the artificial isotopes and their decays created since the 1940s.

Due to the relatively short half-life of its starting isotope neptunium-237 (2.144 million years), the fourth chain, the neptunium series with A = 4n + 1, is already extinct in nature, except for the final rate-limiting step, decay of bismuth-209. Traces of ^{237}Np and its decay products do occur in nature, however, as a result of neutron reactions in uranium ore; neutron capture by natural thorium to give ^{233}U is also possible. The ending isotope of this chain is now known to be thallium-205. Some older sources give the final isotope as bismuth-209, but in 2003 it was discovered that it is very slightly radioactive, with a half-life of 2.01×10^{19} years.

There are also non-transuranic decay chains of unstable isotopes of light elements, for example those of magnesium-28 and chlorine-39. On Earth, most of the starting isotopes of these chains before 1945 were generated by cosmic radiation. Since 1945, the testing and use of nuclear weapons has also released numerous radioactive fission products. Almost all such isotopes decay by either β^{−} or β^{+} decay modes, changing from one element to another at the same atomic mass. The later daughter products in such a chain, being closer to beta-stability, generally have the longer half-lives.

== Heavy nuclei (actinide) decay chains ==
Actinides and fission products by half-life
Actinides by decay chain				Half-life range (a)	Fission products of ^{235}U by yield
4n (Thorium)	4n + 1 (Neptunium)	4n + 2 (Radium)	4n + 3 (Actinium)	Half-life range (a)	4.5–7%	0.04–1.25%	<0.001%
^{228}Ra^{№}				4–6 a		^{155}Eu^{þ}
^{248}Bk				> 9 a
^{244}Cm^{ƒ}	^{241}Pu^{ƒ}	^{250}Cf	^{227}Ac^{№}	10–29 a	^{90}Sr	^{85}Kr	^{113m}Cd^{þ}
^{232}U^{ƒ}		^{238}Pu^{ƒ}	^{243}Cm^{ƒ}	29–97 a	^{137}Cs	^{151}Sm^{þ}	^{121m}Sn
	^{249}Cf^{ƒ}	^{242m}Am^{ƒ}		141–351 a	No fission products have a half-life in the range of 100 a–210 ka ...
	^{241}Am^{ƒ}		^{251}Cf^{ƒ}	430–900 a	No fission products have a half-life in the range of 100 a–210 ka ...
		^{226}Ra^{№}	^{247}Bk	1.3–1.6 ka	No fission products have a half-life in the range of 100 a–210 ka ...
^{240}Pu	^{229}Th	^{246}Cm^{ƒ}	^{243}Am^{ƒ}	4.7–7.4 ka	No fission products have a half-life in the range of 100 a–210 ka ...
	^{245}Cm^{ƒ}	^{250}Cm		8.3–8.5 ka	No fission products have a half-life in the range of 100 a–210 ka ...
			^{239}Pu^{ƒ}	24.1 ka	No fission products have a half-life in the range of 100 a–210 ka ...
		^{230}Th^{№}	^{231}Pa^{№}	32–76 ka	No fission products have a half-life in the range of 100 a–210 ka ...
^{236}Np^{ƒ}	^{233}U^{ƒ}	^{234}U^{№}		150–250 ka	^{99}Tc^{₡}	^{126}Sn
^{248}Cm		^{242}Pu		327–375 ka		^{79}Se^{₡}
				1.33 Ma	^{135}Cs^{₡}
	^{237}Np^{ƒ}			1.61–6.5 Ma	^{93}Zr	^{107}Pd
^{236}U			^{247}Cm^{ƒ}	15–24 Ma		^{129}I^{₡}
^{244}Pu				80 Ma	... nor beyond 15.7 Ma
^{232}Th^{№}		^{238}U^{№}	^{235}U^{ƒ№}	0.7–14.1 Ga	... nor beyond 15.7 Ma
₡, has thermal neutron capture cross section in the range of 8–50 barns; ƒ, fissile; №, primarily a naturally occurring radioactive material (NORM); þ, neutron poison (thermal neutron capture cross section greater than 3k barns)

In the four tables below, very minor branches of decay (branching probability less than one in a million) are omitted. Spontaneous fission is also omitted, though larger than this for the heaviest even nuclei and detectable down to thorium. All nuclear data is taken from unless otherwise noted. The historical names of isotopes are recorded in.

The energy release includes the total kinetic energy of all the emitted particles (electrons, alpha particles, gamma quanta, neutrinos, Auger electrons and X-rays) and the recoiling decay product nucleus; this corresponds to that calculated from atomic masses. The letter 'a' represents a year (from the Latin annus).

In the tables (except for the neptunium series), the historical names of the naturally occurring nuclides are also given. Such names were used at the time when the decay chains were first discovered and investigated; the system listed was only finalized in the 1920s but it would be too confusing to give earlier names also. From these historical names one can thus find the modern isotopic designation.

The three primordial chains given below—thorium, uranium/radium (from uranium-238), and actinium (from uranium-235)—each ends with its own specific lead isotope (lead-208, lead-206, and lead-207 respectively). All the lead isotopes are stable and are also present in nature as primordial nuclides, so their excess amounts in comparison with lead-204 (which has only a primordial origin) are required for accurate uranium–lead dating of rocks. Correlating more than one results in lead-lead dating, capable of even greater accuracy.

=== Thorium series ===

The 4n chain of thorium-232 is commonly called the "thorium series" or "thorium cascade". The series terminates with lead-208, 6 alpha decays and 4 beta decays from thorium.

Plutonium-244 (which appears several steps above thorium-232) was present in the early Solar System, and is just long-lived enough (half-life 81.1 Myr) that it should still survive in trace quantities today, though it probably has not been detected.

The total energy released from thorium-232 to lead-208, including the energy lost to neutrinos, is 42.65 MeV; from californium-252, 71.11 MeV. The last is the largest of the four chains.

Nuclide	Historic names		Decay mode	Half-life (a = years)	Energy released MeV	Decay product
Nuclide	Short	Long	Decay mode	Half-life (a = years)	Energy released MeV	Decay product
^{252}Cf			α	2.645 a	6.217	^{248}Cm
^{248}Cm			α	3.48×10^{5} a	5.162	^{244}Pu
^{244}Pu			α	8.13×10^{7} a	4.666	^{240}U
^{240}U			β^{−}	14.1 h	0.382	^{240m}Np
^{240m}Np			IT 0.12% β^{−} 99.88%	7.22 min	0.018; 2.209	^{240}Np^{240}Pu
^{240}Np			β^{−}	61.9 min	2.191	^{240}Pu
^{240}Pu			α	6561 a	5.256	^{236}U
^{236}U		Thoruranium	α	2.342×10^{7} a	4.573	^{232}Th
^{232}Th	Th	Thorium	α	1.40×10^{10} a	4.082	^{228}Ra
^{228}Ra	MsTh_{1}	Mesothorium 1	β^{−}	5.75 a	0.046	^{228}Ac
^{228}Ac	MsTh_{2}	Mesothorium 2	β^{−}	6.15 h	2.123	^{228}Th
^{228}Th	RdTh	Radiothorium	α	1.9125 a	5.520	^{224}Ra
^{224}Ra	ThX	Thorium X	α	3.632 d	5.789	^{220}Rn
^{220}Rn	Tn	Thoron, Thorium Emanation	α	55.6 s	6.405	^{216}Po
^{216}Po	ThA	Thorium A	α	0.144 s	6.906	^{212}Pb
^{212}Pb	ThB	Thorium B	β^{−}	10.627 h	0.569	^{212}Bi
^{212}Bi	ThC	Thorium C	β^{−} 64.06% α 35.94%	60.55 min	2.252; 6.207	^{212}Po^{208}Tl
^{212}Po	ThC′	Thorium C′	α	294.4 ns	8.954	^{208}Pb
^{208}Tl	ThC″	Thorium C″	β^{−}	3.053 min	4.999	^{208}Pb
^{208}Pb	ThD	Thorium D	stable			

=== Neptunium series ===

The 4n+1 chain of neptunium-237 is commonly called the "neptunium series" or "neptunium cascade". In this series, only two of the isotopes involved are found naturally in significant quantities, namely the final two: bismuth-209 and thallium-205. Some of the other isotopes have been detected in nature, originating from trace quantities of ^{237}Np produced by the (n,2n) knockout reaction in primordial ^{238}U.

This series terminates with the stable isotope thallium-205, 8 alpha decays and 4 beta decays from neptunium.

The neptunium series is fairly unique among the 4, for several reasons:

- Since this series was only discovered and studied in 1947–1948, its nuclides were never given historic names. Each of the other series have many of their nuclides given historical names.
- This series has an isotope of radon only produced in a rare branch (not shown in the illustration) but not in the main decay sequence. Other series produce radon in the main decay sequence, which, if occurring in mineral, would tend to migrate through the mineral and be released as radioactive gas.
- This series ends in thallium (or, practically speaking, bismuth) rather than lead.
- Its parent nuclides are essentially extinct, explaining why the series was discovered much later, after the development of artificial nucleosynthesis. Each of the other series have primordial parent nuclides.

The total energy released from neptunium-237 to thallium-205, including the energy lost to neutrinos, is 49.29 MeV; from californium-249, 66.87 MeV. As the energy of the final step from bismuth to thallium, though known, will not be available until the inconceivable future, it may be better to quote the figures 46.16 MeV and 63.73 MeV to bismuth-209.

Nuclide	Decay mode	Half-life (a = years)	Energy released MeV	Decay product
^{249}Cf	α	351 a	6.293	^{245}Cm
^{245}Cm	α	8250 a	5.624	^{241}Pu
^{241}Pu	β^{−} 99.9975% α 0.0025%	14.33 a	0.021; 5.140	^{241}Am^{237}U
^{241}Am	α	432.6 a	5.638	^{237}Np
^{237}U	β^{−}	6.752 d	0.518	^{237}Np
^{237}Np	α	2.144×10^{6} a	4.957	^{233}Pa
^{233}Pa	β^{−}	26.98 d	0.570	^{233}U
^{233}U	α	1.592×10^{5} a	4.909	^{229}Th
^{229}Th	α	7920 a	5.168	^{225}Ra
^{225}Ra	β^{−} 99.9974% α 0.0026% (Note: The value .026%, found at other places, is a typographical error. The original data is cited here.)	14.8 d	0.356; 5.097	^{225}Ac^{221}Rn
^{225}Ac	α	9.919 d	5.935	^{221}Fr
^{221}Rn	β^{−} 78% α 22%	25.7 min	1.194; 6.163	^{221}Fr^{217}Po
^{221}Fr	α 99.9952% β^{−} 0.0048%	4.801 min	6.457; 0.313	^{217}At^{221}Ra
^{221}Ra	α	25 s	6.880	^{217}Rn
^{217}Po	α 97.5% β^{−} 2.5%	1.53 s	6.662; 1.488	^{213}Pb^{217}At
^{217}At	α 99.992% β^{−} 0.008%	32.6 ms	7.202; 0.736	^{213}Bi^{217}Rn
^{217}Rn	α	590 μs	7.888	^{213}Po
^{213}Pb	β^{−}	10.2 min	2.028	^{213}Bi
^{213}Bi	β^{−} 97.91% α 2.09%	45.6 min	1.422; 5.988	^{213}Po^{209}Tl
^{213}Po	α	3.705 μs	8.536	^{209}Pb
^{209}Tl	β^{−}	2.162 min	3.970	^{209}Pb
^{209}Pb	β^{−}	3.235 h	0.644	^{209}Bi
^{209}Bi	α	2.01×10^{19} a	3.137	^{205}Tl
^{205}Tl	stable			

=== Uranium series ===
(More comprehensive graphic)

The 4n+2 chain of uranium-238 is called the "uranium series" or "radium series", the latter from the first member known when it was named, radium-226. The series terminates with lead-206, 8 alpha decays and 6 beta decays from uranium.

The total energy released from uranium-238 to lead-206, including the energy lost to neutrinos, is 51.69 MeV; from californium-250, 68.28 MeV.

Nuclide	Historic names		Decay mode	Half-life (a = years)	Energy released MeV	Decay product
Nuclide	Short	Long	Decay mode	Half-life (a = years)	Energy released MeV	Decay product
^{250}Cf			α	13.08 a	6.128	^{246}Cm
^{246}Cm			α	4760 a	5.475	^{242}Pu
^{242}Pu			α	3.75×10^{5} a	4.984	^{238}U
^{238}U	U_{I}	Uranium I	α	4.463×10^{9} a	4.270	^{234}Th
^{234}Th	UX_{1}	Uranium X_{1}	β^{−}	24.11 d	0.195	^{234m}Pa
^{234m}Pa	UX_{2}, Bv	Uranium X_{2} Brevium	IT 0.16% β^{−} 99.84%	1.16 min	0.079; 2.273	^{234}Pa^{234}U
^{234}Pa	UZ	Uranium Z	β^{−}	6.70 h	2.194	^{234}U
^{234}U	U_{II}	Uranium II	α	2.455×10^{5} a	4.858	^{230}Th
^{230}Th	Io	Ionium	α	7.54×10^{4} a	4.770	^{226}Ra
^{226}Ra	Ra	Radium	α	1600 a	4.871	^{222}Rn
^{222}Rn	Rn	Radon, Radium Emanation	α	3.8215 d	5.590	^{218}Po
^{218}Po	RaA	Radium A	α 99.98% β^{−} 0.02%	3.097 min	6.115; 0.257	^{214}Pb^{218}At
^{218}At			α 100% β^{−}	1.28 s	6.876; 2.883	^{214}Bi^{218}Rn
^{218}Rn			α	33.75 ms	7.262	^{214}Po
^{214}Pb	RaB	Radium B	β^{−}	27.06 min	1.018	^{214}Bi
^{214}Bi	RaC	Radium C	β^{−} 99.979% α 0.021%	19.9 min	3.269; 5.621	^{214}Po^{210}Tl
^{214}Po	RaC'	Radium C'	α	163.5 μs	7.833	^{210}Pb
^{210}Tl	RaC"	Radium C"	β^{−} β^{−}n 0.009%	1.30 min	5.481; 0.296	^{210}Pb^{209}Pb (in neptunium series)
^{210}Pb	RaD	Radium D	β^{−} α 1.9×10^{−6}%	22.2 a	0.0635; 3.793	^{210}Bi^{206}Hg
^{210}Bi	RaE	Radium E	β^{−} α 1.32×10^{−4}%	5.012 d	1.161; 5.035	^{210}Po^{206}Tl
^{210}Po	RaF	Radium F	α	138.376 d	5.407	^{206}Pb
^{206}Hg			β^{−}	8.32 min	1.307	^{206}Tl
^{206}Tl	RaE"	Radium E"	β^{−}	4.20 min	1.532	^{206}Pb
^{206}Pb	RaG	Radium G	stable			

=== Actinium series ===
(More detailed graphic)

The 4n+3 chain of uranium-235 is commonly called the "actinium series" or "actinium cascade", from the first member known when it was named, actinium-227. This series terminates with lead-207, 7 alpha decays and 4 beta decays from uranium.

In the early Solar System, this chain went back to ^{247}Cm. This manifests itself today as variations in ^{235}U/^{238}U ratios, since curium and uranium have noticeably different chemistries and therefore partitioned differently.

The total energy released from uranium-235 to lead-207, including the energy lost to neutrinos, is 46.40 MeV; from californium-251, 69.91 MeV.

Nuclide	Historic name		Decay mode	Half-life (a = years)	Energy released MeV	Decay product
Nuclide	Short	Long	Decay mode	Half-life (a = years)	Energy released MeV	Decay product
^{251}Cf			α	900 a	6.177	^{247}Cm
^{247}Cm			α	1.56×10^{7} a	5.353	^{243}Pu
^{243}Pu			β^{−}	4.955 h	0.578	^{243}Am
^{243}Am			α	7350 a	5.439	^{239}Np
^{239}Np			β^{-}	2.356 d	0.723	^{239}Pu
^{239}Pu			α	2.411×10^{4} a	5.244	^{235}U
^{235}U	AcU	Actino-uranium	α	7.04×10^{8} a	4.678	^{231}Th
^{231}Th	UY	Uranium Y	β^{−}	25.52 h	0.391	^{231}Pa
^{231}Pa	Pa	Protoactinium	α	3.27×10^{4} a	5.150	^{227}Ac
^{227}Ac	Ac	Actinium	β^{−} 98.62% α 1.38%	21.772 a	0.045; 5.042	^{227}Th^{223}Fr
^{227}Th	RdAc	Radioactinium	α	18.693 d	6.147	^{223}Ra
^{223}Fr	AcK	Actinium K	β^{−} 99.994% α 0.006%	22.00 min	1.149; 5.561	^{223}Ra^{219}At
^{223}Ra	AcX	Actinium X	α	11.435 d	5.979	^{219}Rn
^{219}At			α 93.6% β^{−} 6.4%	56 s	6.342; 1.567	^{215}Bi^{219}Rn
^{219}Rn	An	Actinon, Actinium Emanation	α	3.96 s	6.946	^{215}Po
^{215}Bi			β^{−}	7.6 min	2.171	^{215}Po
^{215}Po	AcA	Actinium A	α β^{−} 2.3×10^{−4}%	1.781 ms	7.526; 0.715	^{211}Pb^{215}At
^{215}At			α	37 μs	8.177	^{211}Bi
^{211}Pb	AcB	Actinium B	β^{−}	36.16 min	1.366	^{211}Bi
^{211}Bi	AcC	Actinium C	α 99.724% β^{−} 0.276%	2.14 min	6.750; 0.573	^{207}Tl^{211}Po
^{211}Po	AcC'	Actinium C'	α	516 ms	7.595	^{207}Pb
^{207}Tl	AcC"	Actinium C"	β^{−}	4.77 min	1.418	^{207}Pb
^{207}Pb	AcD	Actinium D	stable			

== See also ==
- Nuclear physics
- Radioactive decay
- Valley of stability
- Decay product
- Radioisotopes (radionuclide)
- Radiometric dating
