= Isotopes of francium =

Isotopes of francium (_{87}Fr)
Main isotopes			Decay	
Isotope	abundance	half-life (t_{1/2})	mode	product
^{212}Fr	synth	20.0 min	β^{+}	^{212}Rn
^{212}Fr	synth	20.0 min	α	^{208}At
^{221}Fr	trace	4.801 min	α	^{217}At
^{221}Fr	trace	4.801 min	β^{−}	^{221}Ra
^{222}Fr	synth	14.2 min	β^{−}	^{222}Ra
^{223}Fr	trace	22.00 min	β^{−}	^{223}Ra
^{223}Fr	trace	22.00 min	α	^{219}At

Francium (_{87}Fr) has no stable isotopes, so a standard atomic weight cannot be given. Its most stable isotope is ^{223}Fr with a half-life of 22 minutes, occurring in trace quantities in nature as an intermediate decay product of ^{235}U.

Of elements whose most stable isotopes have been identified with certainty, francium is the most unstable, though astatine is the rarest in nature due to its naturally occurring isotopes having even shorter half-lives and even smaller branching ratios.

In the case of all elements with atomic number 106 (seaborgium) and above, no isotopes have been discovered whose half-life exceeds that of francium-223. However, the isotopes of these elements so far discovered are all on the proton-rich side of beta stability; so there is a strong possibility that some undiscovered isotopes of these elements will have longer half-lives, which could exceed that of francium-223.

== List of isotopes ==
Nuclide (Note: ^{m}Fr – Excited nuclear isomer.)	Historic name	Z	N	Isotopic mass (Da) (Note: ( ) – Uncertainty (1σ) is given in concise form in parentheses after the corresponding last digits.) (Note: # – Atomic mass marked #: value and uncertainty derived not from purely experimental data, but at least partly from trends from the Mass Surface (TMS).)	Discovery year	Half-life (Note: # – Values marked # are not purely derived from experimental data, but at least partly from trends of neighboring nuclides (TNN).)	Decay mode (Note: Modes of decay: α: / Alpha decay; β^{+}: / Positron emission; β^{−}: / Beta decay; CD: / Cluster decay; IT: / Isomeric transition)	Daughter isotope	Spin and parity (Note: ( ) spin value – Indicates spin with weak assignment arguments.)	Isotopic abundance
Nuclide	Historic name	Excitation energy			Discovery year	Half-life	Decay mode	Daughter isotope	Spin and parity	Isotopic abundance
^{197}Fr		87	110	197.01101(6)	2013	2.3(19) ms	α	^{193}At	(7/2−)	
^{198}Fr		87	111	198.01028(3)	2013	15(3) ms	α	^{194}At	3+#	
^{198m}Fr (Note: Order of ground state and isomer is uncertain.)		0(50) keV			2013	1.1(7) ms	α	^{194}At	(10−)	
^{199}Fr		87	112	199.007269(15)	1999	6.6(22) ms	α	^{195}At	1/2+#	
^{199m1}Fr		45(13) keV			2013	6.5(9) ms	α	^{195}At	7/2−#	
^{199m2}Fr		250(50)# keV			2013	2.2(12) ms	α	^{195}At	13/2+#	
^{200}Fr		87	113	200.00658(3)	1995	47.5(28) ms	α	^{196}At	(3+)	
^{200m1}Fr		50(60) keV			2014	190(120) ms	α	^{196}At	10−#	
^{200m2}Fr		150(50)# keV			(2014) (Note: Isomer had only been suggested, not included in discovery database)	790(360) ns				
^{201}Fr		87	114	201.003852(10)	1980	62.8(19) ms	α	^{197}At	9/2−	
^{201m1}Fr		129(10) keV			2005	24(6) ms	α	^{197}At	1/2+	
^{201m2}Fr		289.5(4) keV			2014	720(40) ns	IT	^{201}Fr	13/2+	
^{202}Fr		87	115	202.003330(6)	1980	372(12) ms	α	^{198}At	3+	
^{202m}Fr		257(6) keV			1992	286(13) ms	α	^{198}At	10−	
^{202m}Fr		257(6) keV			1992	286(13) ms	IT (?%)	^{202}Fr	10−	
^{203}Fr		87	116	203.000941(7)	1967	550(10) ms	α	^{199}At	9/2−	
^{203m1}Fr		361(6) keV			2013	43(4) ms	IT (80%)	^{203}Fr	1/2+	
^{203m1}Fr		361(6) keV			2013	43(4) ms	α (20%)	^{199}At	1/2+	
^{203m2}Fr		426.0(10) keV			2013	370(50) ns	IT	^{203}Fr	13/2+	
^{204}Fr		87	117	204.000652(26)	1964	1.75(26) s	α (96%)	^{200}At	3+	
^{204}Fr		87	117	204.000652(26)	1964	1.75(26) s	β^{+} (4%)	^{204}Rn	3+	
^{204m1}Fr		50(4) keV			1967	2.41(19) s	α (90%)	^{200}At	7+	
^{204m1}Fr		50(4) keV			1967	2.41(19) s	β^{+} (10%)	^{204}Rn	7+	
^{204m2}Fr		326(4) keV			1992	1.65(15) s	α (53%)	^{200}At	10−	
^{204m2}Fr		326(4) keV			1992	1.65(15) s	IT (47%)	^{204}Fr	10−	
^{205}Fr		87	118	204.998594(8)	1964	3.90(7) s	α (98.5%)	^{201}At	9/2−	
^{205}Fr		87	118	204.998594(8)	1964	3.90(7) s	β^{+} (1.5%)	^{205}Rn	9/2−	
^{205m1}Fr		544.0(10) keV			2012	80(20) ns	IT	^{205}Fr	13/2+	
^{205m2}Fr		609(6) keV			2012	1.15(4) ms	IT	^{205}Fr	(1/2+)	
^{206}Fr		87	119	205.998661(30)	1964	~16 s	α (88.4%)	^{202}At	3+	
^{206}Fr		87	119	205.998661(30)	1964	~16 s	β^{+} (11.6%)	^{206}Rn	3+	
^{206m1}Fr		200(40) keV			2015	~16 s	α (84.7%)	^{202}At	7+	
^{206m1}Fr		200(40) keV			2015	~16 s	β^{+} (?%)	^{206}Rn	7+	
^{206m1}Fr		200(40) keV			2015	~16 s	IT (?%)	^{206}Fr	7+	
^{206m2}Fr		730(40) keV			1981	700(100) ms	IT (87%)	^{206}Fr	10−	
^{206m2}Fr		730(40) keV			1981	700(100) ms	α (13%)	^{202}At	10−	
^{207}Fr		87	120	206.996941(19)	1964	14.8(1) s	α (95%)	^{203}At	9/2−	
^{207}Fr		87	120	206.996941(19)	1964	14.8(1) s	β^{+} (5%)	^{207}Rn	9/2−	
^{208}Fr		87	121	207.997139(13)	1964	59.1(3) s	α (89%)	^{204}At	7+	
^{208}Fr		87	121	207.997139(13)	1964	59.1(3) s	β^{+} (11%)	^{208}Rn	7+	
^{208m}Fr		826.3(5) keV			2009	432(11) ns	IT	^{208}Fr	10−	
^{209}Fr		87	122	208.995940(12)	1964	50.5(7) s	α (89%)	^{205}At	9/2−	
^{209}Fr		87	122	208.995940(12)	1964	50.5(7) s	β^{+} (11%)	^{209}Rn	9/2−	
^{209m}Fr		4659.8(7) keV			2006	420(18) ns	IT	^{209}Fr	45/2−	
^{210}Fr		87	123	209.996411(14)	1964	3.18(6) min	α (71%)	^{206}At	6+	
^{210}Fr		87	123	209.996411(14)	1964	3.18(6) min	β^{+} (29%)	^{210}Rn	6+	
^{210m}Fr		4417.2(10) keV			2016	475(6) ns	IT	^{210}Fr	(23)+	
^{211}Fr		87	124	210.995555(13)	1964	3.10(2) min	α (87%)	^{207}At	9/2−	
^{211}Fr		87	124	210.995555(13)	1964	3.10(2) min	β^{+} (13%)	^{211}Rn	9/2−	
^{211m1}Fr		2423.16(24) keV			1986	146(14) ns	IT	^{211}Fr	29/2+	
^{211m2}Fr		4657.3(4) keV			1986	124.5(12) ns	IT	^{211}Fr	45/2−	
^{212}Fr		87	125	211.996225(9)	1950	20.0(6) min	β^{+} (57%)	^{212}Rn	5+	
^{212}Fr		87	125	211.996225(9)	1950	20.0(6) min	α (43%)	^{208}At	5+	
^{212m1}Fr		1551.4(3) keV			1990	31.9(7) μs	IT	^{212}Fr	11+	
^{212m2}Fr		2492.2(4) keV			1977	604(28) ns	IT	^{212}Fr	15−	
^{212m3}Fr		5854.7(6) keV			1986	312(21) ns	IT	^{212}Fr	27−	
^{212m4}Fr		8533.4(11) keV			1990	23.6(21) μs	IT	^{212}Fr	34+#	
^{213}Fr		87	126	212.996184(5)	1964	34.14(6) s	α (99.44%)	^{209}At	9/2−	
^{213}Fr		87	126	212.996184(5)	1964	34.14(6) s	β^{+} (0.56%)	^{213}Rn	9/2−	
^{213m1}Fr		1590.41(18) keV			1976	505(14) ns	IT	^{213}Fr	21/2−	
^{213m2}Fr		2537.62(23) keV			1976	238(6) ns	IT	^{213}Fr	29/2+	
^{213m3}Fr		8094.8(7) keV			1989	3.1(2) μs	IT	^{213}Fr	(65/2−)	
^{214}Fr		87	127	213.998971(9)	1966	5.51(13) ms	α	^{210}At	(1−)	
^{214m1}Fr		121(5) keV			1968	3.35(5) ms	α	^{210}At	(8−)	
^{214m2}Fr		638(5) keV			1994	103(4) ns	IT	^{214}Fr	(11+)	
^{214m3}Fr		6577(100)# keV			1994	108(7) ns	IT	^{214}Fr	(33+)	
^{215}Fr		87	128	215.000342(8)	1970	90(4) ns	α	^{211}At	9/2−	
^{216}Fr		87	129	216.003190(4)	1970	700(20) ns	α	^{212}At	(1−)	
^{216m}Fr		219(6) keV			2007	850(30) ns	α	^{212m1}At	(9−)	
^{217}Fr		87	130	217.004632(7)	1968	22(5) μs	α	^{213}At	9/2−	
^{218}Fr		87	131	218.007579(5)	1949	1.4(5) ms	α	^{214}At	1−	
^{218m}Fr		87(4) keV			1982	21.9(5) ms	α	^{214}At	(8−)	
^{219}Fr		87	132	219.009251(7)	1948	22.5(17) ms	α	^{215}At	9/2−	
^{220}Fr		87	133	220.012327(4)	1948	27.4(3) s	α (99.65%)	^{216}At	1+	
^{220}Fr		87	133	220.012327(4)	1948	27.4(3) s	β^{−} (0.35%)	^{220}Ra	1+	
^{221}Fr		87	134	221.014254(5)	1947	4.801(5) min	α	^{217}At	5/2−	Trace (Note: Intermediate decay product of ^{237}Np)
^{221}Fr		87	134	221.014254(5)	1947	4.801(5) min	β^{−} (0.0048%)	^{221}Ra	5/2−	Trace
^{221}Fr		87	134	221.014254(5)	1947	4.801(5) min	CD (8.8×10^{−11}%) (Note: The nuclide with the lowest atomic number known to undergo cluster decay)	^{207}Tl + ^{14}C	5/2−	Trace
^{222}Fr		87	135	222.017583(8)	1975	14.2(3) min	β^{−} (Note: Theoretically capable of α decay to ^{218}At with a partial half-life of ~1 d (branching ratio ~1%).)	^{222}Ra	2−	
^{223}Fr	Actinium K	87	136	223.0197342(21)	1939	22.00(7) min	β^{−}	^{223}Ra	3/2−	Trace (Note: Intermediate decay product of ^{235}U)
^{223}Fr	Actinium K	87	136	223.0197342(21)	1939	22.00(7) min	α (0.006%)	^{219}At	3/2−	Trace
^{224}Fr		87	137	224.023348(12)	1969	3.33(10) min	β^{−}	^{224}Ra	1−	
^{225}Fr		87	138	225.025572(13)	1969	3.95(14) min	β^{−}	^{225}Ra	3/2−	
^{226}Fr		87	139	226.029545(7)	1969	48.5(7) s	β^{−}	^{226}Ra	1−	
^{227}Fr		87	140	227.031865(6)	1972	2.47(3) min	β^{−}	^{227}Ra	1/2+	
^{228}Fr		87	141	228.035839(7)	1972	38(1) s	β^{−}	^{228}Ra	2−	
^{228m}Fr		1004(30) keV			(2008) (Note: Only published in a conference proceeding and not a refereed journal)	180(110) s				
^{229}Fr		87	142	229.038291(5)	1975	50.2(4) s	β^{−}	^{229}Ra	(1/2+)	
^{230}Fr		87	143	230.042391(7)	1987	19.1(5) s	β^{−}	^{230}Ra	2+#	
^{231}Fr		87	144	231.045175(8)	1985	17.6(6) s	β^{−}	^{231}Ra	(1/2+)	
^{232}Fr		87	145	232.049461(15)	1990	5.5(6) s	β^{−}	^{232}Ra	(5)	
^{233}Fr		87	146	233.052518(21)	2010	900(100) ms	β^{−}	^{233}Ra	1/2+#	
This table header & footer:
