= Uranium-235 =

Isotope of uranium

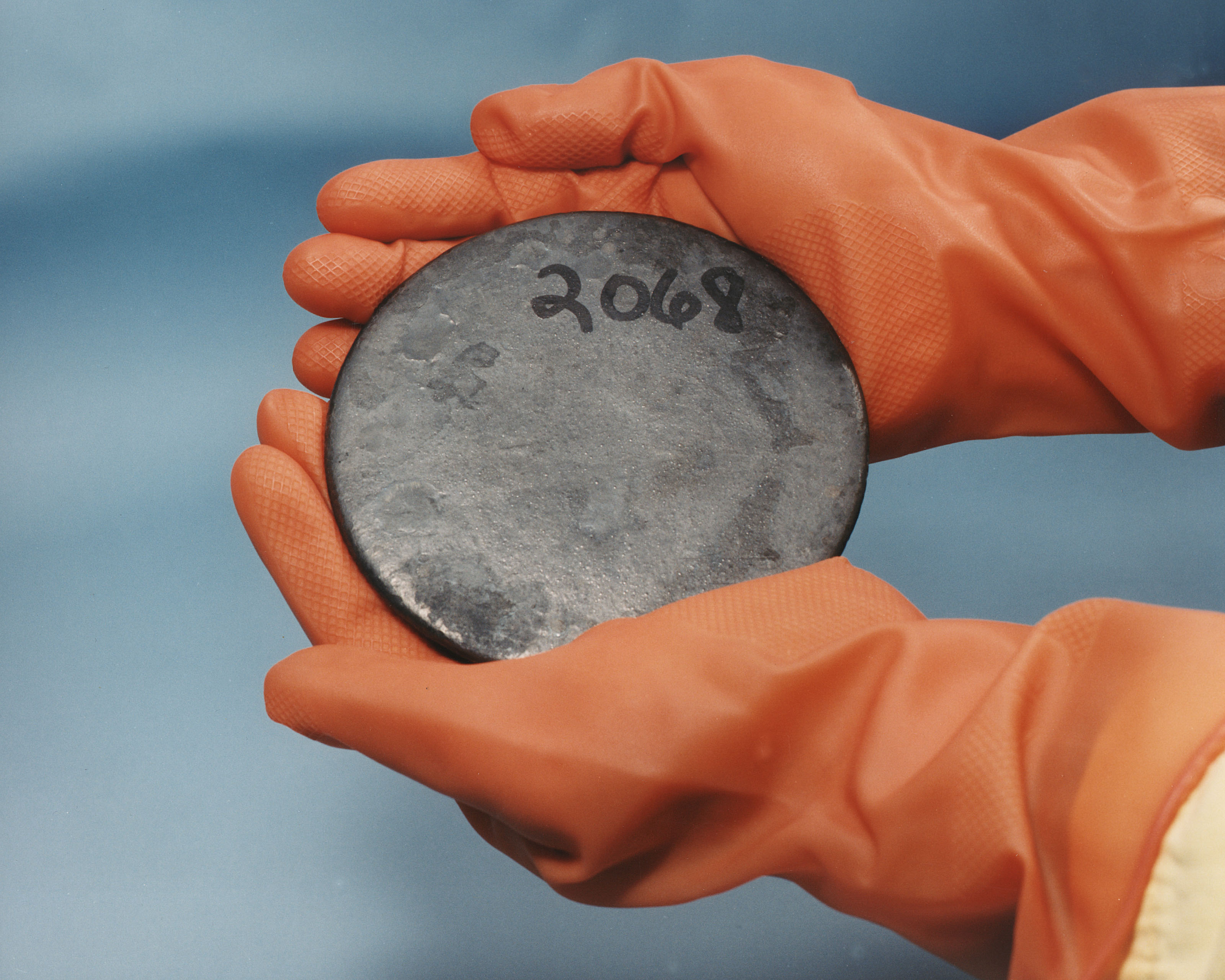
- Uranium metal highly enriched in uranium-235

General
- Symbol: ^{235}U
- Names: uranium-235
- Protons (Z): 92
- Neutrons (N): 143

Nuclide data
- Natural abundance: 0.72%
- Half-life (t_{1/2}): 7.04×10^{8} years
- Isotope mass: 235.043928 Da
- Spin: 7/2−
- Excess energy: 40914.062±1.970 keV
- Nuclear binding energy: 1783870.285±1.996 keV
- Parent isotopes: ^{235}Pa (β^{−})^{235}Np (β^{+})^{239}Pu (α)
- Decay products: ^{231}Th

Decay modes
- Decay mode: Decay energy (MeV)
- Alpha: 4.679

Uranium-235 (^{235}U or U-235) is an isotope of uranium making up about 0.72% of natural uranium. Unlike the predominant isotope uranium-238, it is fissile, i.e., it can sustain a nuclear chain reaction. It is the only fissile isotope that exists in nature as a primordial nuclide and was discovered in 1935 by Arthur Jeffrey Dempster.

The release of energy from the fission of Uranium-235 powers most nuclear reactors and nuclear weapons. Uranium enrichment is the process of taking natural uranium and increasing the proportion of uranium-235. Some reactor types can use natural uranium directly, while nuclear weapons and some others reactor types require uranium enriched in U-235.

Uranium-235 has a half-life of 704 million years. Its fission cross section for slow thermal neutrons is about 584.3±1 barns. For fast neutrons it is on the order of 1 barn. Most neutron absorptions induce fission, though a minority (about 15%) result in the formation of uranium-236.

== Fission properties ==
Nuclear fission seen with a uranium-235 nucleus

The fission of one atom of uranium-235 releases 202.5 MeV (3.24×10^{−11} J) inside the reactor. That corresponds to 19.54 TJ/mol, or 83.14 TJ/kg. Another 8.8 MeV escapes the reactor as anti-neutrinos. When ^{235}_{92}U nuclei are bombarded with neutrons, one of the many fission reactions that it can undergo is the following (shown in the adjacent image):

^{1}_{0}n + ^{235}_{92}U → ^{236}_{92}U → ^{144}_{56}Ba + ^{89}_{36}Kr + 3 ^{1}_{0}n

Heavy water reactors and some graphite moderated reactors can use natural uranium, but light water reactors must use low enriched uranium because of the higher neutron absorption of light water; uranium enrichment uses chemical or physical means to increase the concentration of uranium-235 in otherwise uranium-238-heavy natural uranium. Highly enriched uranium (HEU), which contains an even greater proportion of uranium-235, is sometimes used in the reactors of nuclear submarines, research reactors and nuclear weapons.

Neutron multiplicity distribution for uranium-235 fission (ν > 5 omitted from the figure)

Each fission of Uranium-235 releases an average of 2.43 neutrons, most commonly two or three. If at least one neutron from uranium-235 fission strikes another nucleus and causes it to fission, then the chain reaction will continue. If the reaction continues to sustain itself, it is said to be critical, and the mass of ^{235}U required to produce the critical condition is said to be a critical mass. A critical chain reaction can be achieved at low concentrations of ^{235}U if the neutrons from fission are moderated to lower their speed, since the probability for fission with slow neutrons is greater. A fission chain reaction produces intermediate mass fragments which are highly radioactive and produce further energy by their radioactive decay. Some of them produce neutrons, called delayed neutrons, which contribute to the fission chain reaction. The power output of nuclear reactors is adjusted by the location of control rods containing elements that strongly absorb neutrons, e.g., boron, cadmium, or hafnium, in the reactor core. In nuclear bombs, the reaction is uncontrolled and the large amount of energy released creates a nuclear explosion.

=== Nuclear weapons ===
The Little Boy gun-type atomic bomb dropped on Hiroshima on August 6, 1945, was made of highly enriched uranium with a large tamper. A tamper is a layer of dense material surrounding the fissile material that delays its thermal expansion, keeping it supercritical for longer. The nominal spherical critical mass for an untampered ^{235}U nuclear weapon is 56 kilograms (123 lb), which would form a sphere 17.32 centimetres (6.82 in) in diameter. The material must be 85% or more of ^{235}U and is known as weapons grade uranium, though for a crude and inefficient weapon 20% enrichment is sufficient (called weapon(s)-usable). Even lower enrichment can be used, but this results in the required critical mass rapidly increasing. Use of a large tamper, implosion geometries, trigger tubes, polonium triggers, tritium enhancement, and neutron reflectors can enable a more compact, economical weapon using one-fourth or less of the nominal critical mass, though this would likely only be possible in a country that already had extensive experience in engineering nuclear weapons. Most modern nuclear weapon designs use plutonium-239 as the fissile component of the primary stage; however, HEU (highly enriched uranium, in this case uranium that is 20% or more ^{235}U) is frequently used in the secondary stage as an igniter for the fusion fuel.

Source	Average energy released [MeV]
Instantaneously released energy
Kinetic energy of fission fragments	169.1
Kinetic energy of prompt neutrons	4.8
Energy carried by prompt γ-rays	7.0
Energy from decaying fission products
Energy of β− particles	6.5
Energy of delayed γ-rays	6.3
Energy released when those prompt neutrons which do not (re)produce fission are captured	8.8
Total energy converted into heat in an operating thermal nuclear reactor	202.5 MeV
Energy of anti-neutrinos	8.8
Sum	211.3 MeV

== Decay ==
Uranium-235 is an alpha emitter, producing thorium-231. Uranium-235 is the main progenitor of the actinium series, one of the principal actinide decay chains, as it is the longest-lived and sole primordial nuclide (aside from the final end product, lead-207). Beginning with naturally occurring uranium-235, this series includes isotopes of astatine, bismuth, francium, lead, polonium, protactinium, radium, radon, thallium, and thorium, all of which are present in natural uranium sources. The decay proceeds as (only main decay branches shown):

$\begin{array}{l} {}^{235}_{92}\mathrm{U} \xrightarrow[7.04 \times 10^8\ \mathrm{y}]{\alpha} {}^{231}_{90}\mathrm{Th} \xrightarrow[25.52\ \mathrm{h}]{\beta^-} {}^{231}_{91}\mathrm{Pa} \xrightarrow[3.27 \times 10^4\ \mathrm{y}]{\alpha} {}^{227}_{89}\mathrm{Ac} \\[1em] {}^{227}_{89}\mathrm{Ac} \begin{Bmatrix} \xrightarrow[21.772\ \mathrm{y}]{98.62\%\ \beta^-} {}^{227}_{90}\mathrm{Th} \xrightarrow[18.693\ \mathrm{d}]{\alpha} \\ \xrightarrow[21.772\ \mathrm{y}]{1.38\%\ \alpha} {}^{223}_{87}\mathrm{Fr} \xrightarrow[22.00\ \mathrm{min}]{\beta^-} \end{Bmatrix} {}^{223}_{88}\mathrm{Ra} \xrightarrow[11.435\ \mathrm{d}]{\alpha} {}^{219}_{86}\mathrm{Rn} \xrightarrow[3.96\ \mathrm{s}]{\alpha} {}^{215}_{84}\mathrm{Po} \\[1em] {}^{215}_{84}\mathrm{Po} \xrightarrow[1.781\ \mathrm{ms}]{\alpha} {}^{211}_{82}\mathrm{Pb} \xrightarrow[36.16\ \mathrm{min}]{\beta^-} {}^{211}_{83}\mathrm{Bi} \begin{Bmatrix} \xrightarrow[2.14\ \mathrm{min}]{99.724\%\ \alpha} {}^{207}_{81}\mathrm{Tl} \xrightarrow[4.77\ \mathrm{min}]{\beta^-} \\ \xrightarrow[2.14\ \mathrm{min}]{0.276\%\ \beta^-} {}^{211}_{84}\mathrm{Po} \xrightarrow[0.516\ \mathrm{s}]{\alpha} \end{Bmatrix} {}^{207}_{82}\mathrm{Pb} \end{array}$

Or in tabular form, including minor branches:

Nuclide	Decay mode	Half-life (a = years)	Energy released MeV	Decay product
^{235}U	α	7.04×10^{8} a	4.678	^{231}Th
^{231}Th	β^{−}	25.52 h	0.391	^{231}Pa
^{231}Pa	α	3.27×10^{4} a	5.150	^{227}Ac
^{227}Ac	β^{−} 98.62% α 1.38%	21.772 a	0.045; 5.042	^{227}Th^{223}Fr
^{227}Th	α	18.693 d	6.147	^{223}Ra
^{223}Fr	β^{−} 99.994% α 0.006%	22.00 min	1.149; 5.561	^{223}Ra^{219}At
^{223}Ra	α	11.435 d	5.979	^{219}Rn
^{219}At	α 93.6% β^{−} 6.4%	56 s	6.342; 1.567	^{215}Bi^{219}Rn
^{219}Rn	α	3.96 s	6.946	^{215}Po
^{215}Bi	β^{−}	7.6 min	2.171	^{215}Po
^{215}Po	α β^{−} 2.3×10^{−4}%	1.781 ms	7.526; 0.715	^{211}Pb^{215}At
^{215}At	α	37 μs	8.177	^{211}Bi
^{211}Pb	β^{−}	36.16 min	1.366	^{211}Bi
^{211}Bi	α 99.724% β^{−} 0.276%	2.14 min	6.750; 0.573	^{207}Tl^{211}Po
^{211}Po	α	516 ms	7.595	^{207}Pb
^{207}Tl	β^{−}	4.77 min	1.418	^{207}Pb
^{207}Pb	stable			

== Astrophysical dating ==
Knowledge of current and theoretical production ratios of Uranium-235 to Uranium-238 allows radiometric dating, the time since modern uranium nuclei were formed in stellar nucleosynthesis.

The 1957 B2FH landmark paper in astrophysics explained the r-process by which both nuclei form. The authors predicted their relative abundances, and those of their rapidly alpha-chain decaying parent nuclides. Thus they predicted 1.64 as the ^{235}U/^{238}U ratio contributed to the interstellar medium by r-process events (supernovae and subsequently discovered kilonovae). This takes billions of years to diminish to their present value of 0.0072 (see natural uranium). They investigate scenarios for historical contribution to the solar nebula, before contribution is cut off at the Sun's formation 4.5 billion years ago. The scenarios are: a single supernova, a finite continuous uniform series of supernovae representing the lifetime of the Milky Way, and an infinite series representing the steady-state universe. From the second scenario, they estimated an age of the Milky Way at around 10 billion years, compared to a modern value of 13.61 billion years. At the time, the oldest known objects were globular clusters, of which the oldest were estimated to be about 6.5 billion years old.

Lighter: uranium-234	Uranium-235 is an isotope of uranium	Heavier: uranium-236
Decay product of: protactinium-235 neptunium-235 plutonium-239	Decay chain of uranium-235	Decays to: thorium-231
