= Isotopes of thallium =

Isotopes of thallium (_{81}Tl)
Main isotopes			Decay	
Isotope	abundance	half-life (t_{1/2})	mode	product
^{201}Tl	synth	3.0421 d	ε	^{201}Hg
^{202}Tl	synth	12.31 d	β^{+}	^{202}Hg
^{203}Tl	29.5%	stable		
^{204}Tl	synth	3.78 y	β^{−}	^{204}Pb
^{204}Tl	synth	3.78 y	ε	^{204}Hg
^{205}Tl	70.5%	stable		

Standard atomic weight A_{r}°(Tl)
- [204.382, 204.385]; 204.38±0.01 (abridged)

The only stable isotopes of thallium (_{81}Tl) are ^{203}Tl and ^{205}Tl, which make up all natural thallium. The five short-lived isotopes ^{206}Tl through ^{210}Tl also occur in nature, but only as part of the natural decay chains of heavier elements. Synthetic radioisotopes are known from ^{176}Tl to ^{217}Tl; the most stable is ^{204}Tl with a half-life of 3.78 years, followed by ^{202}Tl (half-life 12.31 days) and ^{201}Tl (half-life 3.0421 days). The naturally-occurring radioisotopes live minutes only, with the longest being ^{207}Tl, with a half-life of 4.77 minutes. All isotopes of thallium are either radioactive or observationally stable, meaning that they are predicted to be radioactive but no actual decay has been observed.

The isotope ^{204}Tl is made by the neutron activation of stable thallium in a nuclear reactor. while ^{202}Tl can be made in a cyclotron as can ^{201}Tl (see section below).

In the fully ionized state, the isotope ^{205}Tl^{81+} becomes unstable, undergoing bound-state β^{−} decay to ^{205}Pb^{81+} with a half-life of 291+33
−27 days, but ^{203}Tl remains stable.

^{205}Tl is the decay product of bismuth-209, an isotope that was once thought to be stable but is now known to undergo alpha decay with an extremely long half-life of 2.01×10^{19} y. Thus ^{205}Tl is now placed at the end of the neptunium decay chain.

The neptunium decay chain, ending at ^{205}Tl.

== List of isotopes ==
Nuclide (Note: ^{m}Tl – Excited nuclear isomer.)	Historic name	Z	N	Isotopic mass (Da) (Note: ( ) – Uncertainty (1σ) is given in concise form in parentheses after the corresponding last digits.) (Note: # – Atomic mass marked #: value and uncertainty derived not from purely experimental data, but at least partly from trends from the Mass Surface (TMS).)	Discovery year	Half-life (Note: # – Values marked # are not purely derived from experimental data, but at least partly from trends of neighboring nuclides (TNN).)	Decay mode (Note: Modes of decay: α: / Alpha decay; β^{+}: / Positron emission; EC: / Electron capture; β^{−}: / Beta decay; IT: / Isomeric transition; SF: / Spontaneous fission; n: / Neutron emission; p: / Proton emission)	Daughter isotope (Note: Bold symbol as daughter – Daughter product is stable.)	Spin and parity (Note: ( ) spin value – Indicates spin with weak assignment arguments.)	Natural abundance (mole fraction)	
Nuclide	Historic name	Excitation energy			Discovery year	Half-life	Decay mode	Daughter isotope	Spin and parity	Normal proportion	Range of variation
^{176}Tl		81	95	176.000628(89)	2004	2.4+1.6 −0.7 ms	p (50%)	^{175}Hg	(3−,4−)		
^{176}Tl		81	95	176.000628(89)	2004	2.4+1.6 −0.7 ms	α (50%)	^{172}Au	(3−,4−)		
^{176m}Tl		671 keV			(2020) (Note: Only published in a thesis and not a refereed journal)	290+200 −80 μs	p (50%)	^{175}Hg			
^{176m}Tl		671 keV			(2020)	290+200 −80 μs	α (50%)	^{172m}Au			
^{177}Tl		81	96	176.996414(23)	1999	18(5) ms	α (73%)	^{173}Au	(1/2+)		
^{177}Tl		81	96	176.996414(23)	1999	18(5) ms	p (27%)	^{176}Hg	(1/2+)		
^{177m}Tl		807(18) keV			1999	230(40) μs	p (51%)	^{176}Hg	(11/2−)		
^{177m}Tl		807(18) keV			1999	230(40) μs	α (49%)	^{173}Au	(11/2−)		
^{178}Tl		81	97	177.99505(11)#	1997	255(9) ms	α (62%)	^{174}Au	(4-,5-)		
^{178}Tl		81	97	177.99505(11)#	1997	255(9) ms	β^{+} (38%)	^{178}Hg	(4-,5-)		
^{178}Tl		81	97	177.99505(11)#	1997	255(9) ms	β^{+}, SF (0.15%)	(various)	(4-,5-)		
^{179}Tl		81	98	178.991122(41)	1983	437(9) ms	α (60%)	^{175}Au	1/2+		
^{179}Tl		81	98	178.991122(41)	1983	437(9) ms	β^{+} (40%)	^{179}Hg	1/2+		
^{179m1}Tl		825(10)# keV			1983	1.41(2) ms	α	^{175}Au	(11/2−)		
^{179m2}Tl		904.5(9) keV			2017	119(14) ns	IT	^{179}Tl	(9/2−)		
^{180}Tl		81	99	179.989919(75)	1987	1.09(1) s	β^{+} (93%)	^{180}Hg	(4-)		
^{180}Tl		81	99	179.989919(75)	1987	1.09(1) s	α (7%)	^{176}Au	(4-)		
^{180}Tl		81	99	179.989919(75)	1987	1.09(1) s	β^{+}, SF (0.0032%)	(various)	(4-)		
^{181}Tl		81	100	180.9862600(98)	1996	2.9(1) s	β^{+} (91.4%)	^{181}Hg	1/2+		
^{181}Tl		81	100	180.9862600(98)	1996	2.9(1) s	α (8.6%)	^{177}Au	1/2+		
^{181m}Tl		835.9(4) keV			1998	1.40(3) ms	IT (99.60%)	^{181}Tl	(9/2−)		
^{181m}Tl		835.9(4) keV			1998	1.40(3) ms	α (0.40%)	^{177}Au	(9/2−)		
^{182}Tl		81	101	181.985693(13)	1991	1.9(1) s	β^{+} (<99.41%)	^{182}Hg	(4−)		
^{182}Tl		81	101	181.985693(13)	1991	1.9(1) s	α (>0.49%)	^{178}Au	(4−)		
^{182}Tl		81	101	181.985693(13)	1991	1.9(1) s	β^{+}, SF (<3.4×10^{−6}%)	^{182}Hg	(4−)		
^{182m}Tl (Note: Order of ground state and isomer is uncertain.)		50(50)# keV			2003	3.1(10) s	β^{+} (97.5%)	^{182}Hg	(7+)		
^{182m}Tl		50(50)# keV			2003	3.1(10) s	α (2.5%)	^{178}Au	(7+)		
^{183}Tl		81	102	182.982193(10)	1980	6.9(7) s	β^{+} (?%)	^{183}Hg	1/2+		
^{183}Tl		81	102	182.982193(10)	1980	6.9(7) s	α (?%)	^{179}Au	1/2+		
^{183m1}Tl		628.7(5) keV			1999	53.3(3) ms	IT (?%)	^{183}Tl	(9/2−)		
^{183m1}Tl		628.7(5) keV			1999	53.3(3) ms	α (1.5%)	^{179}Au	(9/2−)		
^{183m1}Tl		628.7(5) keV			1999	53.3(3) ms	β^{+} (?%)	^{183}Hg	(9/2−)		
^{183m2}Tl		975.3(6) keV			2001	1.48(10) μs	IT	^{183}Tl	(13/2+)		
^{184}Tl		81	103	183.981875(11)	1976	9.5(2) s	β^{+} (98.78%)	^{184}Hg	2−		
^{184}Tl		81	103	183.981875(11)	1976	9.5(2) s	α (1.22%)	^{180}Au	2−		
^{184m1}Tl		−50(30) keV			2016	10.6(5) s	β^{+} (99.53%)	^{184}Hg	(7+)		
^{184m1}Tl		−50(30) keV			2016	10.6(5) s	α (0.47%)	^{180}Au	(7+)		
^{184m2}Tl		450(30) keV			2015	47.1(7) ms	IT (99.91%)	^{184}Tl	(10−)		
^{184m2}Tl		450(30) keV			2015	47.1(7) ms	α (0.089%)	^{180}Au	(10−)		
^{185}Tl		81	104	184.978789(22)	1976	19.5(5) s	β^{+}	^{185}Hg	1/2+		
^{185m}Tl		454.8(15) keV			1977	1.93(8) s	IT	^{185}Tl	9/2−		
^{185m}Tl		454.8(15) keV			1977	1.93(8) s	α (?%)	^{181}Au	9/2−		
^{186}Tl		81	105	185.978655(22)	1974	3.5(5) s	β^{+} (?%)	^{186}Hg	(2−)		
^{186}Tl		81	105	185.978655(22)	1974	3.5(5) s	α (?%)	^{182}Au	(2−)		
^{186m1}Tl		20(40) keV			1975	27.5(10) s	β^{+} (99.99%)	^{186}Hg	7+		
^{186m1}Tl		20(40) keV			1975	27.5(10) s	α (0.006%)	^{182}Au	7+		
^{186m2}Tl		390(40) keV			1975	3.40(9) s	IT (<94.1%)	^{186}Tl	10−		
^{186m2}Tl		390(40) keV			1975	3.40(9) s	β^{+} (>5.9%)	^{186}Hg	10−		
^{187}Tl		81	106	186.9759047(86)	1976	~51 s	β^{+}	^{187}Hg	1/2+		
^{187m1}Tl		334(3) keV			1977	15.60(12) s	β^{+} (?%)	^{187}Hg	9/2−		
^{187m1}Tl		334(3) keV			1977	15.60(12) s	IT (?%)	^{187}Tl	9/2−		
^{187m1}Tl		334(3) keV			1977	15.60(12) s	α (0.15%)	^{183}Au	9/2−		
^{187m2}Tl		1875(50)# keV			2000	1.11(7) μs	IT	^{187}Tl			
^{187m3}Tl		2582.5(3) keV			2000	693(38) ns	IT	^{187}Tl	29/2+#		
^{188}Tl		81	107	187.976021(32)	1970	71(2) s	β^{+}	^{188}Hg	2−#		
^{188m1}Tl		30(30) keV			1974	71.5(15) s	β^{+}	^{188}Hg	7+		
^{188m2}Tl		299(30) keV			1981	41(4) ms	IT	^{188}Tl	9−		
^{189}Tl		81	108	188.9735735(90)	1972	2.3(2) min	β^{+}	^{189}Hg	1/2+		
^{189m}Tl		285(6) keV			1974	1.4(1) min	β^{+}	^{189}Hg	9/2−		
^{190}Tl		81	109	189.9738418(78)	1970	2.6(3) min	β^{+}	^{190}Hg	2−		
^{190m1}Tl		70(7) keV			1970	3.6(3) min	β^{+}	^{190}Hg	7+		
^{190m2}Tl		306(10) keV			1991	60# ms	IT	^{190}Tl	(9−)		
^{191}Tl		81	110	190.9717841(79)	1974	20# min	β^{+}	^{191}Hg	1/2+		
^{191m}Tl		297(7) keV			1981	5.22(16) min	β^{+}	^{191}Hg	9/2−		
^{192}Tl		81	111	191.972225(34)	1961	9.6(4) min	β^{+}	^{192}Hg	2−		
^{192m1}Tl		196(7) keV			1961	10.8(2) min	β^{+}	^{192}Hg	7+		
^{192m2}Tl		447(7) keV			1980	296(5) ns	IT	^{192}Tl	(8−)		
^{192m3}Tl		180(40) keV			(1991) (Note: Half-life not measured, not included in discovery database)		α	^{188}Au	(3+)		
^{193}Tl		81	112	192.9705020(72)	1960	21.6(8) min	β^{+}	^{193}Hg	1/2+		
^{193m}Tl		372(4) keV			1963	2.11(15) min	IT (~75%)	^{193}Tl	9/2−		
^{193m}Tl		372(4) keV			1963	2.11(15) min	β^{+} (~25%)	^{193}Hg	9/2−		
^{194}Tl		81	113	193.971081(15)	1960	33.0(5) min	β^{+}	^{194}Hg	2−		
^{194m}Tl		260(14) keV			1960	32.8(2) min	β^{+}	^{194}Hg	7+		
^{195}Tl		81	114	194.969774(12)	1955	1.16(5) h	β^{+}	^{195}Hg	1/2+		
^{195m}Tl		482.63(17) keV			1957	3.6(4) s	IT	^{195}Tl	9/2−		
^{196}Tl		81	115	195.970481(13)	1955	1.84(3) h	β^{+}	^{196}Hg	2−		
^{196m}Tl		394.2(5) keV			1960	1.41(2) h	β^{+} (96.2%)	^{196}Hg	7+		
^{196m}Tl		394.2(5) keV			1960	1.41(2) h	IT (3.8%)	^{196}Tl	7+		
^{197}Tl		81	116	196.969560(15)	1955	2.84(4) h	β^{+}	^{197}Hg	1/2+		
^{197m}Tl		608.22(8) keV			1957	540(10) ms	IT	^{197}Tl	9/2−		
^{198}Tl		81	117	197.9704467(81)	1949	5.3(5) h	β^{+}	^{198}Hg	2−		
^{198m1}Tl		543.6(4) keV			1953	1.87(3) h	β^{+} (55.9%)	^{198}Hg	7+		
^{198m1}Tl		543.6(4) keV			1953	1.87(3) h	IT (44.1%)	^{198}Tl	7+		
^{198m2}Tl		686.8(5) keV			1975	150(40) ns	IT	^{198}Tl	(5)+		
^{198m3}Tl		742.4(4) keV			1977	32.1(10) ms	IT	^{198}Tl	10−		
^{199}Tl		81	118	198.969877(30)	1949	7.42(8) h	β^{+}	^{199}Hg	1/2+		
^{199m}Tl		748.87(6) keV			1963	28.4(2) ms	IT	^{199}Tl	9/2−		
^{200}Tl		81	119	199.9709636(62)	1949	26.1(1) h	β^{+}	^{200}Hg	2−		
^{200m1}Tl		753.60(24) keV			1963	34.0(9) ms	IT	^{200}Tl	7+		
^{200m2}Tl		762.00(24) keV			1972	397(17) ns	IT	^{200}Tl	5+		
^{201}Tl (Note: Main isotope used in scintigraphy)		81	120	200.970820(15)	1950	3.0421(8) d	EC	^{201}Hg	1/2+		
^{201m1}Tl		919.16(21) keV			1962	2.01(7) ms	IT	^{201}Tl	9/2−		
^{201m2}Tl		2747 keV			2013	95+39 −21 ns	IT	^{201}Tl	(33/2)		
^{202}Tl		81	121	201.9721089(20)	1940	12.31(8) d	EC	^{202}Hg	2−		
^{202m1}Tl		950.19(10) keV			1965	591(3) μs	IT	^{202}Tl	7+		
^{202m2}Tl		4148(10) keV			2020	215(10) μs	IT	^{202}Tl	(20+)		
^{203}Tl		81	122	202.9723441(13)	1931	Observationally Stable (Note: Believed to undergo α decay to ^{199}Au)			1/2+	0.29515(44)	
^{203m1}Tl		1483.7(9) keV			(2020)	<1 μs	IT	^{203}Tl	(9/2−)		
^{203m2}Tl		3565(50)# keV			1998	7.7(5) μs	IT	^{203}Tl	(25/2+)		
^{204}Tl		81	123	203.9738634(12)	1953	3.783(12) y	β^{−} (97.08%)	^{204}Pb	2−		
^{204}Tl		81	123	203.9738634(12)	1953	3.783(12) y	EC (2.92%)	^{204}Hg	2−		
^{204m1}Tl		1104.1(2) keV			1972	61.7(10) μs	IT	^{204}Tl	7+		
^{204m2}Tl		2319.0(3) keV			1998	2.6(2) μs	IT	^{204}Tl	12−		
^{204m3}Tl		4391.6(5) keV			2011	420(30) ns	IT	^{204}Tl	18+		
^{204m4}Tl		6239.4(5) keV			(2011) (Note: Half-life shorter than 100ns, not included in discovery database)	90(3) ns	IT	^{204}Tl	22−		
^{205}Tl (Note: Final decay product of 4n+1 decay chain (the Neptunium series))		81	124	204.9744273(13)	1931	Observationally Stable (Note: Believed to undergo α decay to ^{201}Au) (Note: Can undergo bound-state β^{−} decay to ^{205}Pb^{81+} with a half-life of 291+33 −27 days when fully ionized)			1/2+	0.70485(44)	
^{205m1}Tl		3290.61(17) keV			1982	2.6(2) μs	IT	^{205}Tl	25/2+		
^{205m2}Tl		4835.6(15) keV			(2004) (Note: Only published in a conference proceeding and not a refereed journal)	235(10) ns	IT	^{205}Tl	(35/2–)		
^{206}Tl	Radium E"	81	125	205.9761101(14)	1935	4.202(11) min	β^{−}	^{206}Pb	0−	Trace (Note: Intermediate decay product of ^{238}U)	
^{206m}Tl		2643.10(18) keV			1976	3.74(3) min	IT	^{206}Tl	(12)–		
^{207}Tl	Actinium C"	81	126	206.9774186(58)	1908	4.77(2) min	β^{−}	^{207}Pb	1/2+	Trace (Note: Intermediate decay product of ^{235}U)	
^{207m}Tl		1348.18(16) keV			1965	1.33(11) s	IT	^{207}Tl	11/2–		
^{208}Tl	Thorium C"	81	127	207.9820180(20)	1909	3.053(4) min	β^{−}	^{208}Pb	5+	Trace (Note: Intermediate decay product of ^{232}Th)	
^{208m}Tl		1807(1) keV			2020	1.3(1) μs	IT	^{208}Tl	(0–)		
^{209}Tl		81	128	208.9853517(66)	1950	2.162(7) min	β^{−}	^{209}Pb	1/2+	Trace (Note: Intermediate decay product of ^{237}Np)	
^{209m}Tl		1228.1(20) keV			2009	146(10) ns	IT	^{209}Tl	17/2+		
^{210}Tl	Radium C″	81	129	209.990073(12)	1909	1.30(3) min	β^{−} (99.99%)	^{210}Pb	5+#	Trace	
^{210}Tl	Radium C″	81	129	209.990073(12)	1909	1.30(3) min	β^{−}, n (0.009%)	^{209}Pb	5+#	Trace	
^{210m}Tl		1200(200)# keV			2018	1# min [>3 μs]			(9+,10+)		
^{211}Tl		81	130	210.993475(45)	1998	81(16) s	β^{−} (97.8%)	^{211}Pb	1/2+		
^{211}Tl		81	130	210.993475(45)	1998	81(16) s	β^{−}, n (2.2%)	^{210}Pb	1/2+		
^{211m}Tl		1244(100)# keV			2019	580(80) ns	IT	^{211}Tl	17/2+#		
^{212}Tl		81	131	211.99834(22)#	1998	31(8) s	β^{−} (98.2%)	^{212}Pb	(5+)		
^{212}Tl		81	131	211.99834(22)#	1998	31(8) s	β^{−}, n (1.8%)	^{211}Pb	(5+)		
^{213}Tl		81	132	213.001915(29)	2010	23.8(44) s	β^{−} (92.4%)	^{213}Pb	1/2+#		
^{213}Tl		81	132	213.001915(29)	2010	23.8(44) s	β^{−}, n (7.6%)	^{212}Pb	1/2+#		
^{213m1}Tl		680(300)# keV			2019	4.1(5) μs	IT	^{213}Tl			
^{213m2}Tl		1250(100)# keV			2019	0.6(3) μs	IT	^{213}Tl	17/2+#		
^{213m3}Tl		985.3(19) keV			2024	1.34(5) ms	IT	^{213}Tl	(11/2–)		
^{214}Tl		81	133	214.00694(21)#	2010	11.0(24) s	β^{−} (66%)	^{214}Pb	5+#		
^{214}Tl		81	133	214.00694(21)#	2010	11.0(24) s	β^{−}, n (34%)	^{213}Pb	5+#		
^{215}Tl		81	134	215.01077(32)#	2010	9.7(38) s	β^{−} (95.4%)	^{215}Pb	1/2+#		
^{215}Tl		81	134	215.01077(32)#	2010	9.7(38) s	β^{−}, n (4.6%)	^{214}Pb	1/2+#		
^{215m}Tl		874(5) keV			2024	3.0(3) ms	IT	^{215}Tl	(11/2–)		
^{216}Tl		81	135	216.01596(32)#	2010	5.9(33) s	β^{−} (>88.5%)	^{216}Pb	5+#		
^{216}Tl		81	135	216.01596(32)#	2010	5.9(33) s	β^{−}, n (<11.5%)	^{215}Pb	5+#		
^{217}Tl		81	136	217.02003(43)#	2010	2# s [>300 ns]			1/2+#		
This table header & footer:

== Thallium-201 ==
Thallium-201 (^{201}Tl) is a synthetic radioisotope of thallium. It has a half-life of 3.0421 days and decays by electron capture, emitting photons consisting mainly of K X-rays (~70–80 keV), and gammas of 135 and 167 keV (the latter stronger, emitted in 10% of decays). Thallium-201 is synthesized by the neutron activation of stable thallium in a nuclear reactor, or by the ^{203}Tl(p, 3n)^{201}Pb nuclear reaction in cyclotrons, as ^{201}Pb then decays to ^{201}Tl. It is a radiopharmaceutical, as it has fair imaging characteristics without excessive patient radiation dose. It was the most popular isotope used for nuclear cardiac stress tests.

This nuclide has largely been replaced by technetium-99m, which has a shorter half-life (6 hours instead of 3 days) and a single high-energy photon peak (140 keV), which is better for imaging than the 3 energy peaks of thallium-201. Thallium-201 is now mostly used for myocardial viability studies. It will redistribute in body tissues, whereas Tc will not; Tl is taken up by the cardiac muscle via Na+/K+ pumps. Delayed imaging will show uptake in damaged but still living myocardial cells, which would appear as a scar with Tc or ^{82}Rb.

== See also ==
Daughter products other than thallium

- Isotopes of lead
- Isotopes of mercury
- Isotopes of gold
