= Isotopes of mercury =

Isotopes of mercury (_{80}Hg)
Main isotopes			Decay	
Isotope	abundance	half-life (t_{1/2})	mode	product
^{194}Hg	synth	447 y	ε	^{194}Au
^{195}Hg	synth	10.7 h	β^{+}	^{195}Au
^{196}Hg	0.15%	stable		
^{197}Hg	synth	64.14 h	ε	^{197}Au
^{198}Hg	10.0%	stable		
^{199}Hg	16.9%	stable		
^{200}Hg	23.1%	stable		
^{201}Hg	13.2%	stable		
^{202}Hg	29.7%	stable		
^{203}Hg	synth	46.61 d	β^{−}	^{203}Tl
^{204}Hg	6.82%	stable		

Standard atomic weight A_{r}°(Hg)
- 200.592±0.003; 200.59±0.01 (abridged)

There are seven stable isotopes of mercury (_{80}Hg) with ^{202}Hg being the most abundant (29.74%). The longest-lived radioisotopes are ^{194}Hg with a half-life of 447 years, and ^{203}Hg with a half-life of 46.61 days. Most of the remaining 40 radioisotopes have half-lives that are less than a day. The odd natural isotopes ^{199}Hg and ^{201}Hg are NMR-active, having spin of 1/2 and 3/2 respectively; as NMR is best with spin 1/2, the former is normally used. All isotopes of mercury are either radioactive or observationally stable, meaning that they are predicted to be radioactive but no actual decay has been observed. These isotopes are predicted to undergo either alpha decay or double beta decay.

== List of isotopes ==
Nuclide (Note: ^{m}Hg – Excited nuclear isomer.)	Z	N	Isotopic mass (Da) (Note: ( ) – Uncertainty (1σ) is given in concise form in parentheses after the corresponding last digits.) (Note: # – Atomic mass marked #: value and uncertainty derived not from purely experimental data, but at least partly from trends from the Mass Surface (TMS).)	Discovery year	Half-life (Note: # – Values marked # are not purely derived from experimental data, but at least partly from trends of neighboring nuclides (TNN).)	Decay mode (Note: Modes of decay: EC: / Electron capture; IT: / Isomeric transition)	Daughter isotope (Note: Bold symbol as daughter – Daughter product is stable.)	Spin and parity (Note: ( ) spin value – Indicates spin with weak assignment arguments.)	Natural abundance (mole fraction)	
Nuclide	Excitation energy			Discovery year	Half-life	Decay mode	Daughter isotope	Spin and parity	Normal proportion	Range of variation
^{170}Hg	80	90	170.00581(32)#	2019	310(250) μs	α	^{166}Pt	0+		
^{171}Hg	80	91	171.00359(33)#	2004	70(30) μs	α	^{167}Pt	3/2−#		
^{172}Hg	80	92	171.99886(16)	1999	231(9) μs	α	^{168}Pt	0+		
^{173}Hg	80	93	172.99714(22)#	1999	800(80) μs	α	^{169}Pt	(7/2−)		
^{174}Hg	80	94	173.992871(21)	1997	2.0(4) ms	α	^{170}Pt	0+		
^{175}Hg	80	95	174.99144(9)	1983	10.2(3) ms	α	^{171}Pt	(7/2−)		
^{175m}Hg	494(2) keV			2009	340(30) ns	IT	^{175}Hg	(13/2+)		
^{176}Hg	80	96	175.987349(12)	1983	20.3(14) ms	α (90%)	^{172}Pt	0+		
^{176}Hg	80	96	175.987349(12)	1983	20.3(14) ms	β^{+} (10%)	^{176}Au	0+		
^{177}Hg	80	97	176.98628(9)	1975	117(7) ms	α	^{173}Pt	7/2−		
^{177m}Hg	323.2(13) keV			2003	1.50(15) μs	IT	^{177}Hg	13/2+		
^{178}Hg	80	98	177.982485(12)	1971	266.5(24) ms	α (89%)	^{174}Pt	0+		
^{178}Hg	80	98	177.982485(12)	1971	266.5(24) ms	β^{+} (11%)	^{178}Au	0+		
^{179}Hg	80	99	178.98182(3)	1970	1.05(3) s	α (75%)	^{175}Pt	7/2−		
^{179}Hg	80	99	178.98182(3)	1970	1.05(3) s	β^{+} (25%)	^{179}Au	7/2−		
^{179}Hg	80	99	178.98182(3)	1970	1.05(3) s	β^{+}, p (0.15%)	^{178}Pt	7/2−		
^{179m}Hg	171.4(4) keV			2002	6.4(9) μs	IT	^{179}Hg	13/2+		
^{180}Hg	80	100	179.978260(14)	1970	2.59(1) s	β^{+} (52%)	^{180}Au	0+		
^{180}Hg	80	100	179.978260(14)	1970	2.59(1) s	α (48%)	^{176}Pt	0+		
^{181}Hg	80	101	180.977819(17)	1969	3.6(1) s	β^{+} (73%)	^{181}Au	1/2−		
^{181}Hg	80	101	180.977819(17)	1969	3.6(1) s	α (27%)	^{177}Pt	1/2−		
^{181}Hg	80	101	180.977819(17)	1969	3.6(1) s	β^{+}, p (0.014%)	^{180}Pt	1/2−		
^{181}Hg	80	101	180.977819(17)	1969	3.6(1) s	β^{+}, α (9×10^{−6}%)	^{177}Ir	1/2−		
^{181m}Hg	210(50) keV			2009	480(20) μs	IT	^{181}Hg	13/2+		
^{182}Hg	80	102	181.974689(11)	1968	10.83(6) s	β^{+} (86.2%)	^{182}Au	0+		
^{182}Hg	80	102	181.974689(11)	1968	10.83(6) s	α (13.8%)	^{178}Pt	0+		
^{182}Hg	80	102	181.974689(11)	1968	10.83(6) s	β^{+}, p (<1×10^{−5}%)	^{181}Pt	0+		
^{183}Hg	80	103	182.974445(8)	1969	9.4(7) s	β^{+} (88.3%)	^{183}Au	1/2−		
^{183}Hg	80	103	182.974445(8)	1969	9.4(7) s	α (11.7%)	^{179}Pt	1/2−		
^{183}Hg	80	103	182.974445(8)	1969	9.4(7) s	β^{+}, p (2.6×10^{−4}%)	^{182}Pt	1/2−		
^{183m}Hg	204(14) keV			2022	>5# μs			13/2+#		
^{184}Hg	80	104	183.971718(10)	1969	30.87(26) s	β^{+} (98.89%)	^{184}Au	0+		
^{184}Hg	80	104	183.971718(10)	1969	30.87(26) s	α (1.11%)	^{180}Pt	0+		
^{185}Hg	80	105	184.971891(15)	1960	49.1(10) s	β^{+} (94%)	^{185}Au	1/2−		
^{185}Hg	80	105	184.971891(15)	1960	49.1(10) s	α (6%)	^{181}Pt	1/2−		
^{185m}Hg	103.7(4) keV			1970	21.6(15) s	IT (54%)	^{185}Hg	13/2+		
^{185m}Hg	103.7(4) keV			1970	21.6(15) s	β^{+} (46%)	^{185}Au	13/2+		
^{185m}Hg	103.7(4) keV			1970	21.6(15) s	α (0.03%)	^{181}Pt	13/2+		
^{186}Hg	80	106	185.969362(13)	1960	1.38(6) min	β^{+} (99.98%)	^{186}Au	0+		
^{186}Hg	80	106	185.969362(13)	1960	1.38(6) min	α (0.016%)	^{182}Pt	0+		
^{186m}Hg	2217.3(4) keV			1973	82(5) μs	IT	^{186}Hg	(8−)		
^{187}Hg	80	107	186.969814(14)	1960	1.9(3) min	β^{+}	^{187}Au	3/2−		
^{187m}Hg	58(14) keV			1979	2.4(3) min	β^{+}	^{187}Au	13/2+		
^{188}Hg	80	108	187.967581(7)	1960	3.25(15) min	β^{+}	^{188}Au	0+		
^{188}Hg	80	108	187.967581(7)	1960	3.25(15) min	α (3.7×10^{−5}%)	^{184}Pt	0+		
^{188m}Hg	2724.1(4) keV			1983	142(14) ns	IT	^{188}Hg	12+		
^{189}Hg	80	109	188.96819(3)	1960	7.6(2) min	β^{+}	^{189}Au	3/2−		
^{189m}Hg	80(30) keV			1966	8.6(2) min	β^{+}	^{189}Au	13/2+		
^{190}Hg	80	110	189.966322(17)	1959	20.0(5) min	β^{+}	^{190}Au	0+		
^{191}Hg	80	111	190.967158(24)	1954	49(10) min	β^{+}	^{191}Au	3/2−		
^{191m}Hg	128(22) keV			1971	50.8(15) min	β^{+}	^{191}Au	13/2+		
^{192}Hg	80	112	191.965634(17)	1952	4.85(20) h	EC	^{192}Au	0+		
^{193}Hg	80	113	192.966653(17)	1952	3.80(15) h	β^{+}	^{193}Au	3/2−		
^{193m}Hg	140.76(5) keV			1958	11.8(2) h	β^{+} (92.8%)	^{193}Au	13/2+		
^{193m}Hg	140.76(5) keV			1958	11.8(2) h	IT (7.2%)	^{193}Hg	13/2+		
^{194}Hg	80	114	193.965449(3)	1962	447(28) y	EC	^{194}Au	0+		
^{195}Hg	80	115	194.966706(25)	1952	10.69(16) h	β^{+}	^{195}Au	1/2−		
^{195m}Hg	176.07(4) keV			1952	41.60(19) h	IT (54.2%)	^{195}Hg	13/2+		
^{195m}Hg	176.07(4) keV			1952	41.60(19) h	β^{+} (45.8%)	^{195}Au	13/2+		
^{196}Hg	80	116	195.965833(3)	1927	Observationally Stable (Note: Believed to undergo β^{+}β^{+} decay to ^{196}Pt with a half-life over 2.5×10^{18} years; also theorized to undergo α decay to ^{192}Pt)			0+	0.0015(1)	
^{197}Hg	80	117	196.967214(3)	1941	64.93(7) h	EC	^{197}Au	1/2−		
^{197m}Hg	298.93(8) keV			1943	23.82(4) h	IT (94.68%)	^{197}Hg	13/2+		
^{197m}Hg	298.93(8) keV			1943	23.82(4) h	EC (5.32%)	^{197}Au	13/2+		
^{198}Hg	80	118	197.9667692(5)	1925	Observationally Stable (Note: Believed to undergo α decay to ^{194}Pt)			0+	0.1004(3)	
^{199}Hg	80	119	198.9682810(6)	1925	Observationally Stable (Note: Believed to undergo α decay to ^{195}Pt)			1/2−	0.1694(12)	
^{199m}Hg	532.48(10) keV			1965	42.67(9) min	IT	^{199}Hg	13/2+		
^{200}Hg	80	120	199.9683269(6)	1925	Observationally Stable (Note: Believed to undergo α decay to ^{196}Pt)			0+	0.2314(9)	
^{201}Hg	80	121	200.9703031(8)	1925	Observationally Stable (Note: Believed to undergo α decay to ^{197}Pt)			3/2−	0.1317(9)	
^{201m}Hg	766.22(15) keV			1962	94.0(20) μs	IT	^{201}Hg	13/2+		
^{202}Hg	80	122	201.9706436(8)	1920	Observationally Stable (Note: Believed to undergo α decay to ^{198}Pt)			0+	0.2974(13)	
^{203}Hg	80	123	202.9728724(18)	1943	46.610(10) d	β^{−}	^{203}Tl	5/2−		
^{203m1}Hg	933.14(23) keV			1962	22.1(10) μs	IT	^{203}Hg	(13/2+)		
^{203m2}Hg	8281.3(5) keV			2011	146(30) ns	IT	^{203}Hg	(53/2+)		
^{204}Hg	80	124	203.9734940(5)	1920	Observationally Stable (Note: Believed to undergo β^{−}β^{−} decay to ^{204}Pb)			0+	0.0682(4)	
^{204m}Hg	7226.08(17) keV			2015	~485 ns	IT	^{204}Hg	22+		
^{205}Hg	80	125	204.976073(4)	1940	5.14(9) min	β^{−}	^{205}Tl	1/2−		
^{205m1}Hg	1556.4(3) keV			1985	1.09(4) ms	IT	^{205}Hg	13/2+		
^{205m2}Hg	3316.6(8) keV			2011	5.89(18) μs	IT	^{205}Hg	(23/2−)		
^{206}Hg	80	126	205.977514(22)	1961	8.32(7) min	β^{−}	^{206}Tl	0+	Trace (Note: Intermediate decay product of ^{238}U)	
^{206m1}Hg	2102.4(3) keV			1982	2.088(17) μs	IT	^{206}Hg	5−		
^{206m2}Hg	3722.3(10) keV			2001	106(3) ns	IT	^{206}Hg	(10+)		
^{207}Hg	80	127	206.98230(3)	1982	2.9(2) min	β^{−}	^{207}Tl	9/2+		
^{208}Hg	80	128	207.98576(3)	1994	135(10) s	β^{−}	^{208}Tl	0+		
^{208m}Hg	1338(24) keV			2009	99(14) ns	IT	^{208}Hg	(8+)		
^{209}Hg	80	129	208.99076(16)#	1998	6.3(11) s	β^{−}	^{209}Tl	9/2+#		
^{210}Hg	80	130	209.99431(22)#	1998	64(12) s	β^{−} (97.8%)	^{210}Tl	0+		
^{210}Hg	80	130	209.99431(22)#	1998	64(12) s	β^{−}, n (2.2%)	^{209}Tl	0+		
^{210m1}Hg	663(2) keV			2013	2.1(7) μs	IT	^{210}Hg	(3−)		
^{210m2}Hg	1406(23) keV			2013	2(1) μs	IT	^{210}Hg	8+#		
^{211}Hg	80	131	210.99958(22)#	2010	26.4(81) s	β^{−} (93.7%)	^{211}Tl	9/2+#		
^{211}Hg	80	131	210.99958(22)#	2010	26.4(81) s	β^{−}, n (6.3%)	^{210}Tl	9/2+#		
^{212}Hg	80	132	212.00324(32)#	2010	30# s [>300 ns]			0+		
^{213}Hg	80	133	213.00880(32)#	2010	15# s [>300 ns]			9/2+#		
^{214}Hg	80	134	214.01264(43)#	2010	8# s [>300 ns]			0+		
^{215}Hg	80	135	215.01837(43)#	2010	600# ms [>300 ns]			9/2+#		
^{216}Hg	80	136	216.02246(43)#	2010	2# s [>300 ns]			0+		
This table header & footer:

== See also ==
Daughter products other than mercury

- Isotopes of thallium
- Isotopes of gold
- Isotopes of platinum
- Isotopes of iridium
