= Isotopes of astatine =

Isotopes of astatine (_{85}At)
Main isotopes			Decay	
Isotope	abundance	half-life (t_{1/2})	mode	product
^{207}At	synth	1.81 h	β^{+}90%	^{207}Po
^{207}At	synth	1.81 h	α10%	^{203}Bi
^{208}At	synth	1.63 h	β^{+}99.5%	^{208}Po
^{208}At	synth	1.63 h	α0.55%	^{204}Bi
^{209}At	synth	5.41 h	β^{+}96.1%	^{209}Po
^{209}At	synth	5.41 h	α3.9%	^{205}Bi
^{210}At	synth	8.1 h	β^{+}99.8%	^{210}Po
^{210}At	synth	8.1 h	α0.175%	^{206}Bi
^{211}At	synth	7.214 h	ε58.2%	^{211}Po
^{211}At	synth	7.214 h	α41.8%	^{207}Bi

Astatine (_{85}At) has 41 known isotopes, all of which are radioactive, whose mass numbers range from 188 to 229 except 189; they are accompanied by almost as many metastable excited states. The longest-lived isotope is ^{210}At, which has a half-life of 8.1 hours, followed by the medically useful ^{211}At, with a half-life of 7.214 hours. The longest-lived isomer is ^{202m1}At with a half-life of just over 3 minutes. However, the longest-lived isotope existing in naturally occurring decay chains is ^{219}At with a half-life of only 56 seconds.

== List of isotopes ==
Nuclide (Note: ^{m}At – Excited nuclear isomer.)	Z	N	Isotopic mass (Da) (Note: ( ) – Uncertainty (1σ) is given in concise form in parentheses after the corresponding last digits.) (Note: # – Atomic mass marked #: value and uncertainty derived not from purely experimental data, but at least partly from trends from the Mass Surface (TMS).)	Discovery year	Half-life	Decay mode (Note: Modes of decay: EC: / Electron capture; IT: / Isomeric transition)	Daughter isotope (Note: Bold italics symbol as daughter – Daughter product is nearly stable.)	Spin and parity (Note: ( ) spin value – Indicates spin with weak assignment arguments.) (Note: # – Values marked # are not purely derived from experimental data, but at least partly from trends of neighboring nuclides (TNN).)	Isotopic abundance
Nuclide	Excitation energy			Discovery year	Half-life	Decay mode	Daughter isotope	Spin and parity	Isotopic abundance
^{188}At	85	103		2025	190+350 −80 μs	α (~50%)	^{184}Bi		
^{188}At	85	103		2025	190+350 −80 μs	p (~50%)	^{187}Po		
^{190}At	85	105		2023	1.0+1.4 −0.4 ms	α	^{186}Bi	(10−)	
^{191}At	85	106	191.004148(17)	2003	2.1(8) ms	α	^{187}Bi	1/2+	
^{191m}At	58(20) keV			2003	2.2(4) ms	α	^{187}Bi	(7/2−)	
^{192}At	85	107	192.003141(3)	2006	11.5(6) ms	α	^{188}Bi	3+#	
^{192m}At (Note: Order of ground state and isomer is uncertain.)	0(40) keV			2006	88(6) ms	α	^{188m2}Bi	(9−, 10−)	
^{193}At	85	108	192.999928(23)	2003	29(5) ms	α	^{189}Bi	1/2+	
^{193m1}At	8(9) keV			2003	21(5) ms	α	^{189m1}Bi	7/2−	
^{193m2}At	42(9) keV			2003	28(4) ms	IT (76%)	^{193}At	13/2+	
^{193m2}At	42(9) keV			2003	28(4) ms	α (24%)	^{189m2}Bi	13/2+	
^{194}At	85	109	193.999231(25)	2009	286(7) ms	α (91.7%#)	^{190}Bi	(5−)	
^{194}At	85	109	193.999231(25)	2009	286(7) ms	β^{+} (8.3%#)	^{194}Po	(5−)	
^{194}At	85	109	193.999231(25)	2009	286(7) ms	β^{+}, SF (0.032%#)	(various)	(5−)	
^{194m}At	−20(40) keV			2009	323(7) ms	α (91.7%#)	^{190}Bi	10−	
^{194m}At	−20(40) keV			2009	323(7) ms	β^{+} (8.3%#)	^{194}Po	10−	
^{194m}At	−20(40) keV			2009	323(7) ms	β^{+}, SF (0.032%#)	(various)	10−	
^{195}At	85	110	194.996274(10)	1999	290(20) ms	α	^{191m1}Bi	1/2+	
^{195}At	85	110	194.996274(10)	1999	290(20) ms	β^{+} ?	^{195}Po	1/2+	
^{195m}At	29(7) keV			1999	143(3) ms	α (88%)	^{191}Bi	7/2-	
^{195m}At	29(7) keV			1999	143(3) ms	IT (12%)	^{195}At	7/2-	
^{195m}At	29(7) keV			1999	143(3) ms	β^{+}?	^{195}Po	7/2-	
^{196}At	85	111	195.99580(3)	1967	377(4) ms	α (97.5%)	^{192}Bi	(3+)	
^{196}At	85	111	195.99580(3)	1967	377(4) ms	β^{+} (2.5%)	^{196}Po	(3+)	
^{196}At	85	111	195.99580(3)	1967	377(4) ms	β^{+}, SF (0.009%)	(various)	(3+)	
^{196m1}At	−40(40) keV			(1996) (Note: Half-life not measured, not included in discovery database)	20# ms	α	^{192m}Bi	10−#	
^{196m2}At	157.9(1) keV			2000	11(2) μs	IT	^{196}At	(5+)	
^{197}At	85	112	196.993177(9)	1967	388.2(56) ms	α (96.1%)	^{193}Bi	9/2−	
^{197}At	85	112	196.993177(9)	1967	388.2(56) ms	β^{+} (3.9%)	^{197}Po	9/2−	
^{197m1}At	45(8) keV			1986	2.0(2) s	α	^{193m1}Bi	1/2+	
^{197m1}At	45(8) keV			1986	2.0(2) s	IT (<0.004%)	^{197}At	1/2+	
^{197m1}At	45(8) keV			1986	2.0(2) s	β^{+}?	^{197}Po	1/2+	
^{197m2}At	310.7(2) keV			1999	1.3(2) μs	IT	^{197}At	13/2+	
^{198}At	85	113	197.992798(5)	1967	4.47(5) s	α (97%)	^{194}Bi	3+	
^{198}At	85	113	197.992798(5)	1967	4.47(5) s	β^{+} (3%)	^{198}Po	3+	
^{198m}At	266.6(27) keV			1967	1.23(5) s	α (93%)	^{194}Bi	10−	
^{198m}At	266.6(27) keV			1967	1.23(5) s	β^{+} ?	^{198}Po	10−	
^{198m}At	266.6(27) keV			1967	1.23(5) s	IT ?	^{198}At	10−	
^{199}At	85	114	198.990528(6)	1967	7.02(12) s	α (89%)	^{195}Bi	9/2−	
^{199}At	85	114	198.990528(6)	1967	7.02(12) s	β^{+} (11%)	^{199}Po	9/2−	
^{199m1}At	244.0(10) keV			2013	273(9) ms	IT (99%)	^{199}At	1/2+	
^{199m1}At	244.0(10) keV			2013	273(9) ms	α (1%)	^{195}Bi	1/2+	
^{199m2}At	572.9(1) keV			(2000) (Note: Half-life shorter than 100ns, not included in discovery database)	70(20) ns	IT	^{199}At	13/2+	
^{199m3}At	2293.4(5) keV			2010	800(50) ns	IT	^{199m2}At	(29/2+)	
^{200}At	85	115	199.990351(26)	1963	43.2(9) s	α (52%)	^{196}Bi	(3+)	
^{200}At	85	115	199.990351(26)	1963	43.2(9) s	β^{+} (48%)	^{200}Po	(3+)	
^{200m1}At	112.9(29) keV			1992	47(1) s	β^{+} (57%)	^{200}Po	(7+)	
^{200m1}At	112.9(29) keV			1992	47(1) s	α (43%)	^{196}Bi	(7+)	
^{200m1}At	112.9(29) keV			1992	47(1) s	IT ?	^{200}At	(7+)	
^{200m2}At	343.8(30) keV			1967	8.0(21) s	IT ?	^{200}At	(10−)	
^{200m2}At	343.8(30) keV			1967	8.0(21) s	α (10.5%)	^{196}Bi	(10−)	
^{200m2}At	343.8(30) keV			1967	8.0(21) s	β^{+} ?	^{200}Po	(10−)	
^{201}At	85	116	200.988417(9)	1963	85.2(16) s	α (71%)	^{197}Bi	9/2−	
^{201}At	85	116	200.988417(9)	1963	85.2(16) s	β^{+} (29%)	^{201}Po	9/2−	
^{201m1}At	459(1) keV			2014	45(3) ms	IT	^{201}At	1/2+	
^{201m2}At	2319.8(3) keV			2015	3.39(9) μs	IT	^{201}At	29/2+	
^{202}At	85	117	201.988626(30)	1961	184(1) s	β^{+} (88%)	^{202}Po	3+	
^{202}At	85	117	201.988626(30)	1961	184(1) s	α (12%)	^{198}Bi	3+	
^{202m1}At	190(40) keV			1992	182(2) s	β^{+} (91.5%)	^{202}Po	7+	
^{202m1}At	190(40) keV			1992	182(2) s	α (8.5%)	^{198}Bi	7+	
^{202m1}At	190(40) keV			1992	182(2) s	IT ?	^{202}At	7+	
^{202m2}At	590(40) keV			1992	460(50) ms	IT (99.904%)	^{202}At	10−	
^{202m2}At	590(40) keV			1992	460(50) ms	α (0.096%)	^{198}Bi	10−	
^{202m2}At	590(40) keV			1992	460(50) ms	IT ?	^{202}At	10−	
^{203}At	85	118	202.986943(11)	1951	7.4(2) min	β^{+} (69%)	^{203}Po	9/2−	
^{203}At	85	118	202.986943(11)	1951	7.4(2) min	α (31%)	^{199}Bi	9/2−	
^{203m1}At	683.4(3) keV			2017	3.5(6) ms	IT	^{203}At	1/2+	
^{203m2}At	2330.1(4) keV			2018	9.77(21) μs	IT	^{203}At	29/2+	
^{204}At	85	119	203.987251(24)	1961	9.12(11) min	β^{+} (96.2%)	^{204}Po	7+	
^{204}At	85	119	203.987251(24)	1961	9.12(11) min	α (3.8%)	^{200}Bi	7+	
^{204m}At	587.30(20) keV			1975	108(10) ms	IT	^{204}At	10−	
^{205}At	85	120	204.986061(13)	1951	26.9(8) min	β^{+} (90%)	^{205}Po	9/2−	
^{205}At	85	120	204.986061(13)	1951	26.9(8) min	α (10%)	^{201}Bi	9/2−	
^{205m}At	2339.64(23) keV			1982	7.76(14) μs	IT	^{205}At	29/2+	
^{206}At	85	121	205.986646(15)	1961	30.6(8) min	β^{+} (99.1%)	^{206}Po	(6)+	
^{206}At	85	121	205.986646(15)	1961	30.6(8) min	α (0.9%)	^{202}Bi	(6)+	
^{206m}At	810(2) keV			1999	813(21) ns	IT	^{206}At	(10)−	
^{207}At	85	122	206.985800(13)	1951	1.81(3) h	β^{+} (~90%)	^{207}Po	9/2−	
^{207}At	85	122	206.985800(13)	1951	1.81(3) h	α (~10%)	^{203}Bi	9/2−	
^{207m1}At	2117.3(6) keV			1978	108(2) ns	IT	^{207}At	25/2+	
^{207m2}At	2384.6(2) keV			2023	~3.5 μs	IT	^{207}At	29/2+	
^{208}At	85	123	207.986613(10)	1950	1.63(3) h	β^{+} (99.45%)	^{208}Po	6+	
^{208}At	85	123	207.986613(10)	1950	1.63(3) h	α (0.55%)	^{204}Bi	6+	
^{208m}At	2276.4(18) keV			1984	1.5(2) μs	IT	^{208}At	16-	
^{209}At	85	124	208.986169(5)	1951	5.42(5) h	β^{+} (96.1%)	^{209}Po	9/2−	
^{209}At	85	124	208.986169(5)	1951	5.42(5) h	α (3.9%)	^{205}Bi	9/2−	
^{209m}At	2429.32(22) keV			1975	916(10) ns	IT	^{209}At	29/2+	
^{210}At	85	125	209.987147(8)	1949	8.1(4) h	β^{+} (99.825%)	^{210}Po	(5)+	
^{210}At	85	125	209.987147(8)	1949	8.1(4) h	α (0.175%)	^{206}Bi	(5)+	
^{210m1}At	2549.6(2) keV			1972	482(6) ns	IT	^{210}At	(15)−	
^{210m2}At	4027.7(2) keV			1978	5.66(7) μs	IT	^{210}At	(19)+	
^{211}At	85	126	210.9874962(29)	1940	7.214(7) h	EC (58.2%)	^{211}Po	9/2−	
^{211}At	85	126	210.9874962(29)	1940	7.214(7) h	α (41.8%)	^{207}Bi	9/2−	
^{211m}At	4814.5(5) keV			1971	4.23(7) μs	IT	^{211}At	(39/2-)	
^{212}At	85	127	211.9907373(26)	1954	314(3) ms	α (Note: Theoretically capable of β^{+} decay to ^{212}Po or β^{−} decay to ^{212}Rn; the branching ratios are expected to be <3×10^{−2}% and <2×10^{−6}% (partial half-lives >17.4 min and >182 d) respectively.)	^{208}Bi	(1−)	
^{212m1}At	222.9(9) keV			1963	119(3) ms	α	^{208}Bi	(9−)	
^{212m2}At	4771.4(15) keV			1998	152(5) μs	IT	^{212}At	(25−)	
^{213}At	85	128	212.992937(5)	1968	125(6) ns	α (Note: Theoretically capable of electron capture to ^{213}Po; the branching ratio is expected to be <2.5×10^{−12}% (partial half-life >57.9 d).)	^{209}Bi	9/2−	
^{213m1}At	1358(23) keV			1980	110(17) ns	IT	^{213}At	25/2-#	
^{213m2}At	2998(27) keV			2013	45(4) μs	IT	^{213}At	49/2+#	
^{214}At	85	129	213.996372(4)	1949	558(10) ns	α	^{210}Bi	1−	
^{214m1}At	59(9) keV			1982	265(30) ns	α	^{210}Bi		
^{214m2}At	232(5) keV			1982	760(15) ns	α	^{210m}Bi	9−	
^{215}At	85	130	214.998651(7)	1944	37(3) μs	α	^{211}Bi	9/2−	Trace (Note: Intermediate decay product of ^{235}U)
^{216}At	85	131	216.002423(4)	1948	300(30) μs	α (Note: Theoretically capable of electron capture to ^{216}Po or β^{−} decay to ^{216}Rn; the branching ratios are expected to be <3×10^{−7}% and <6×10^{−3}% (partial half-lives >1.2 d and >5.0 s) respectively.)	^{212}Bi	1−	
^{216m}At	161(11) keV			(1971)	100# μs	α	^{212m1}Bi	9−#	
^{217}At	85	132	217.004718(5)	1947	32.6(3) ms	α (99.992%)	^{213}Bi	9/2−	Trace (Note: Intermediate decay product of ^{237}Np)
^{217}At	85	132	217.004718(5)	1947	32.6(3) ms	β^{−} (0.008%)	^{217}Rn	9/2−	Trace
^{218}At	85	133	218.008696(12)	1939	1.28(6) s	α (~100%)	^{214}Bi	(2−,3−)	Trace (Note: Intermediate decay product of ^{238}U)
^{218}At	85	133	218.008696(12)	1939	1.28(6) s	β^{−} ?	^{218}Rn	(2−,3−)	Trace
^{219}At	85	134	219.011161(3)	1953	56(3) s	α (93.6%)	^{215}Bi	(9/2−)	Trace
^{219}At	85	134	219.011161(3)	1953	56(3) s	β^{−} (6.4%)	^{219}Rn	(9/2−)	Trace
^{220}At	85	135	220.015433(15)	1989	3.71(4) min	β^{−} (92%)	^{220}Rn	3(−#)	
^{220}At	85	135	220.015433(15)	1989	3.71(4) min	α (8%)	^{216}Bi	3(−#)	
^{221}At	85	136	221.018017(15)	1989	2.3(2) min	β^{−}	^{221}Rn	3/2−#	
^{222}At	85	137	222.022494(17)	1989	54(10) s	β^{−}	^{222}Rn		
^{223}At	85	138	223.025151(15)	1989	50(7) s	β^{−}	^{223}Rn	3/2−#	
^{224}At	85	139	224.029749(24)	2010	2.5 +/- 1.5 min	β^{−}	^{224}Rn	2+#	
^{225}At	85	140	225.03253(32)#	2010	3# s [>300 ns]	β^{−} ?	^{225}Rn	1/2+#	
^{226}At	85	141	226.03721(32)#	2010	7# min [>300 ns]	β^{−} ?	^{226}Rn	2+#	
^{227}At	85	142	227.04018(32)#	2010	5# s [>300 ns]	β^{−} ?	^{227}Rn	1/2+#	
^{228}At	85	143	228.04496(43)#	2010	1# min [>300 ns]	β^{−} ?	^{228}Rn	3+#	
^{229}At	85	144	229.04819(43)#	2010	1# s [>300 ns]	β^{−} ?	^{229}Rn	1/2+#	
^{230}At	85	145		(2010)					
This table header & footer:

== Alpha decay ==
Alpha decay characteristics for astatine isotopes, with all nuclear data from NUBASE2020. (Note: In the table, under the words "mass excess", the energy equivalents are given rather than the real mass excesses; "mass excess of daughter" stands for the energy equivalent of the mass excess sum of the daughter of the isotope and the alpha particle; "alpha decay half-life" refers to the half-life if decay modes other than alpha are omitted.)
Mass number	Mass excess	Mass excess of daughter	Energy of alpha decay	Half-life	Probability of alpha decay	Alpha decay half-life
195	−3.470 MeV	−10.814 MeV	7.344 MeV	0.29 s	~100%	0.29 s
196	−3.910 MeV	−11.105 MeV	7.195 MeV	0.377 s	97.5%	0.39 s
197	−6.355 MeV	−13.460 MeV	7.105 MeV	0.388 s	96.1%	0.40 s
198	−6.709 MeV	−13.598 MeV	6.889 MeV	4.47 s	97%	4.6 s
199	−8.823 MeV	−15.601 MeV	6.778 MeV	7.0 s	89%	7.9 s
200	−8.988 MeV	−15.584 MeV	6.596 MeV	43.2 s	52%	83 s
201	−10.789 MeV	−17.262 MeV	6.473 MeV	85.2 s	71%	2.0 min
202	−10.595 MeV	−16.949 MeV	6.354 MeV	184 s	12%	2.6 min
203	−12.163 MeV	−18.373 MeV	6.210 MeV	7.4 min	31%	2.4 min
204	−11.875 MeV	−17.946 MeV	6.071 MeV	9.1 min	3.8%	4.0 h
205	−12.985 MeV	−19.004 MeV	6.039 MeV	26.9 min	10%	4.5 h
206	−12.439 MeV	−18.326 MeV	5.887 MeV	30.6 min	0.90%	2.4 d
207	−13.227 MeV	−19.100 MeV	5.873 MeV	1.81 h	~10%	18 h
208	−12.470 MeV	−18.221 MeV	5.751 MeV	1.63 h	0.55%	12.3 d
209	−12.884 MeV	−18.641 MeV	5.757 MeV	5.42 h	3.9%	5.8 d
210	−11.972 MeV	−17.603 MeV	5.631 MeV	8.1 h	0.175%	193 d
211	−11.647 MeV	−17.630 MeV	5.983 MeV	7.214 h	41.80%	17 h
212	−8.628 MeV	−16.445 MeV	7.817 MeV	0.314 s	%	0.31 s
213	−6.580 MeV	−15.834 MeV	9.254 MeV	125 ns	100%	125 ns
214	−3.379 MeV	−12.367 MeV	8.988 MeV	0.56 μs	100%	0.56 μs
215	−1.257 MeV	−9.434 MeV	8.177 MeV	37 μs	100%	37 μs
216	2.257 MeV	−5.693 MeV	7.950 MeV	0.3 ms	100%	0.3 ms
217	4.395 MeV	−2.807 MeV	7.202 MeV	32.6 ms	99.992%	33 ms
218	8.100 MeV	1.224 MeV	6.876 MeV	1.28 s	~100%	1.28 s
219	10.396 MeV	4.054 MeV	6.342 MeV	56 s	93.6%	60 s
220	14.376 MeV	8.299 MeV	6.077 MeV	3.71 min	8%	46 min
221	16.783 MeV	11.155 MeV	5.628 MeV	2.3 min	experimentally alpha stable	-

Alpha decay energy follows the same trend as for other heavy elements. The lighter astatine isotopes have quite high decay energies, which become lower as more neutrons are added, reaching a minimum at 125 neutrons (astatine-210), even though 126 (astatine-211) is the magic number. The decay energies increase much more steeply, though, on the next two steps, reaching a high at 128 neutrons where the alpha-decay product would have the magic number of 126. Here this is astatine-213, releasing the highest energy and having the shortest life (125 ns) of all the isotopes. The energy then declines again, and alpha lifetimes increase quickly, no long-lived astatine isotope exists; this happens due to the increasing role of beta decay. This decay mode is especially important for astatine: as early as 1950, it was postulated that the element has no beta-stable isotopes (i.e. ones that do not undergo beta decay at all), though nuclear mass measurements reveal that ^{215}At is in fact beta-stable, as it has the lowest mass of all isobars with A = 215. A beta decay mode has been found for all other astatine isotopes except for ^{212-216}At and their isomers. Among other isotopes, if they do not undergo alpha decay: astatine-210 and the lighter isotopes decay by electron capture or positron emission, 211 by electron capture only, and astatine-217 and heavier isotopes undergo β^{-} decay. Astatine-212, 214, and 216 should be able to decay either way.

== See also ==
Daughter products other than astatine

- Isotopes of radon
- Isotopes of polonium
- Isotopes of bismuth
