= Isotopes of radon =

Isotopes of radon (_{86}Rn)
Main isotopes			Decay	
Isotope	abundance	half-life (t_{1/2})	mode	product
^{210}Rn	synth	2.4 h	α96%	^{206}Po
^{210}Rn	synth	2.4 h	β^{+}4%	^{210}At
^{211}Rn	synth	14.6 h	β^{+}72.6%	^{211}At
^{211}Rn	synth	14.6 h	α27.4%	^{207}Po
^{219}Rn	trace	3.96 s	α	^{215}Po
^{220}Rn	trace	55.6 s	α	^{216}Po
^{222}Rn	trace	3.8215 d	α	^{218}Po

There are 39 known isotopes of radon (_{86}Rn), from ^{193}Rn to ^{231}Rn; all are radioactive. The most stable isotope is ^{222}Rn with a half-life of 3.8215 days, which decays into ^{218}Po.

Six isotopes of radon, ^{217-222}Rn, occur in trace quantities in nature as decay products of, respectively, ^{217}At, ^{218}At, ^{223}Ra, ^{224}Ra, ^{225}Ra, and ^{226}Ra. ^{217}Rn and ^{221}Rn are produced in rare branches in the decay chain of trace quantities of ^{237}Np; ^{222}Rn (and also ^{218}Rn in a rare branch) is an intermediate step in the decay chain of ^{238}U; ^{219}Rn is an intermediate step in the decay chain of ^{235}U; and ^{220}Rn occurs in the decay chain of ^{232}Th.

== List of isotopes ==
Nuclide (Note: ^{m}Rn – Excited nuclear isomer.)	Historic name	Z	N	Isotopic mass (Da) (Note: ( ) – Uncertainty (1σ) is given in concise form in parentheses after the corresponding last digits.) (Note: # – Atomic mass marked #: value and uncertainty derived not from purely experimental data, but at least partly from trends from the Mass Surface (TMS).)	Discovery year	Half-life	Decay mode	Daughter isotope	Spin and parity (Note: ( ) spin value – Indicates spin with weak assignment arguments.) (Note: # – Values marked # are not purely derived from experimental data, but at least partly from trends of neighboring nuclides (TNN).)	Isotopic abundance
Nuclide	Historic name	Excitation energy			Discovery year	Half-life	Decay mode	Daughter isotope	Spin and parity	Isotopic abundance
^{193}Rn		86	107	193.009708(27)	2006	1.15(27) ms	α	^{189}Po	(3/2−)	
^{194}Rn		86	108	194.006146(18)	2006	780(160) μs	α	^{190}Po	0+	
^{195}Rn		86	109	195.005422(55)	2001	7(3) ms	α	^{191}Po	3/2−	
^{195m}Rn (Note: Order of ground state and isomer is uncertain.)		80(50) keV			2001	6(3) ms	α	^{191}Po	13/2+	
^{196}Rn		86	110	196.002120(15)	1995	4.7(11) ms	α	^{192}Po	0+	
^{197}Rn		86	111	197.001621(17)	1995	54(6) ms	α	^{193}Po	3/2−	
^{197m}Rn		199(11) keV			1995	25.6(25) ms	α	^{193}Po	13/2+	
^{198}Rn		86	112	197.998679(14)	1984	64.4(16) ms	α	^{194}Po	0+	
^{199}Rn		86	113	198.9983254(78)	1980	590(30) ms	α	^{195}Po	3/2−	
^{199m}Rn		220(11) keV			1980	310(20) ms	α	^{195}Po	13/2+	
^{200}Rn		86	114	199.9957053(62)	1971	1.09(16) s	α	^{196}Po	0+	
^{200m}Rn		2320(20)# keV			2002	28(9) μs	IT	^{200}Rn		
^{201}Rn		86	115	200.995591(11)	1967	7.0(4) s	α	^{197}Po	3/2−	
^{201m}Rn		245(12) keV			1971	3.8(1) s	α	^{197}Po	13/2+	
^{202}Rn		86	116	201.993264(19)	1967	9.7(1) s	α (78%)	^{198}Po	0+	
^{202}Rn		86	116	201.993264(19)	1967	9.7(1) s	β^{+} (22%)	^{202}At	0+	
^{202m}Rn		2310(50)# keV			2002	2.22(7) μs	IT	^{202}Rn	11−#	
^{203}Rn		86	117	202.9933612(62)	1967	44.2(16) s	α (66%)	^{199}Po	3/2−	
^{203}Rn		86	117	202.9933612(62)	1967	44.2(16) s	β^{+} (34%)	^{203}At	3/2−	
^{203m}Rn		362(4) keV			1967	26.9(5) s	α (75%)	^{199}Po	13/2+	
^{203m}Rn		362(4) keV			1967	26.9(5) s	β^{+} (25%)	^{203}At	13/2+	
^{204}Rn		86	118	203.9914437(80)	1967	1.242(23) min	α (72.4%)	^{200}Po	0+	
^{204}Rn		86	118	203.9914437(80)	1967	1.242(23) min	β^{+} (27.6%)	^{204}At	0+	
^{205}Rn		86	119	204.9917232(55)	1967	170(4) s	β^{+} (75.4%)	^{205}At	5/2−	
^{205}Rn		86	119	204.9917232(55)	1967	170(4) s	α (24.6%)	^{201}Po	5/2−	
^{205m}Rn		657.1(5) keV			2010	>10 s	IT	^{205}Rn	13/2+#	
^{206}Rn		86	120	205.9901954(92)	1954	5.67(17) min	α (62%)	^{202}Po	0+	
^{206}Rn		86	120	205.9901954(92)	1954	5.67(17) min	β^{+} (38%)	^{206}At	0+	
^{207}Rn		86	121	206.9907302(51)	1954	9.25(17) min	β^{+} (79%)	^{207}At	5/2−	
^{207}Rn		86	121	206.9907302(51)	1954	9.25(17) min	α (21%)	^{203}Po	5/2−	
^{207m}Rn		899.1(10) keV			1974	184.5(9) μs	IT	^{207}Rn	13/2+	
^{208}Rn		86	122	207.989635(11)	1955	24.35(14) min	α (62%)	^{204}Po	0+	
^{208}Rn		86	122	207.989635(11)	1955	24.35(14) min	β^{+} (38%)	^{208}At	0+	
^{208m}Rn		1828.3(4) keV			1981	487(12) ns	IT	^{208}Rn	8+	
^{209}Rn		86	123	208.990401(11)	1952	28.8(10) min	β^{+} (83%)	^{209}At	5/2−	
^{209}Rn		86	123	208.990401(11)	1952	28.8(10) min	α (17%)	^{205}Po	5/2−	
^{209m1}Rn		1174.01(13) keV			1985	13.4(13) μs	IT	^{209}Rn	13/2+	
^{209m2}Rn		3636.81(23) keV			1985	3.0(3) μs	IT	^{209}Rn	35/2+	
^{210}Rn		86	124	209.9896889(49)	1952	2.4(1) h	α (96%)	^{206}Po	0+	
^{210}Rn		86	124	209.9896889(49)	1952	2.4(1) h	β^{+} (4%)	^{210}At	0+	
^{210m1}Rn		1710(30) keV			1979	644(40) ns	IT	^{210}Rn	8+	
^{210m2}Rn		3857(30) keV			1979	1.06(5) μs	IT	^{210}Rn	17−	
^{210m3}Rn		6514(30) keV			1979	1.04(7) μs	IT	^{210}Rn	23+	
^{211}Rn		86	125	210.9906008(73)	1952	14.6(2) h	β^{+} (72.6%)	^{211}At	1/2−	
^{211}Rn		86	125	210.9906008(73)	1952	14.6(2) h	α (27.4%)	^{207}Po	1/2−	
^{211m1}Rn		1603(14)# keV			1981	596(28) ns	IT	^{211}Rn	17/2−	
^{211m2}Rn		8905(20)# keV			1985	201(4) ns	IT	^{211}Rn	63/2−	
^{212}Rn		86	126	211.9907039(33)	1950	23.9(12) min	α	^{208}Po	0+	
^{212m1}Rn		1639.68(15) keV			1977	118(14) ns	IT	^{212}Rn	6+	
^{212m2}Rn		1694.1(3) keV			1975	910(30) ns	IT	^{212}Rn	8+	
^{212m3}Rn		6174.2(3) keV			1977	102(4) ns	IT	^{212}Rn	22+	
^{212m4}Rn		8579.2(4) keV			1977	154(14) ns	IT	^{212}Rn	30+	
^{213}Rn		86	127	212.9938851(36)	1966	19.5(1) ms	α (Note: Theoretically capable of electron capture to ^{213}At; the branching ratio is expected to be <5.8×10^{−4}% (partial half-life >56 min))	^{209}Po	9/2+#	
^{213m1}Rn		1682(10) keV			1983	1.00(21) μs	IT	^{213}Rn	(25/2+)	
^{213m2}Rn		2205(10) keV			1983	1.36(7) μs	IT	^{213}Rn	(31/2−)	
^{213m3}Rn		5965(14) keV			1988	164(11) ns	IT	^{213}Rn	(55/2+)	
^{214}Rn		86	128	213.9953627(99)	1970	259(3) ns	α	^{210}Po	0+	
^{214m}Rn		4595.4(18) keV			1983	245(30) ns	IT	^{214}Rn	(22+)	
^{215}Rn		86	129	214.9987450(65)	1952	2.30(10) μs	α (Note: Theoretically capable of electron capture to ^{215}At; the branching ratio is expected to be <1.0×10^{−11}% (partial half-life >266 d))	^{211}Po	9/2+	
^{216}Rn		86	130	216.0002719(62)	1949	29(4) μs	α	^{212}Po	0+	
^{217}Rn		86	131	217.0039276(45)	1949	593(38) μs	α	^{213}Po	9/2+	Trace (Note: Intermediate decay product of ^{237}Np)
^{218}Rn		86	132	218.0056011(25)	1948	33.75(15) ms	α	^{214}Po	0+	Trace (Note: Intermediate decay product of ^{238}U)
^{219}Rn	Actinon; Actinium emanation	86	133	219.0094787(23)	1903	3.96(1) s	α (Note: Theoretically capable of β^{−} decay to ^{219}Fr with a partial half-life calculated as ~1.3×10^{6} s (~15 d; branching ratio ~3.0×10^{−4}%))	^{215}Po	5/2+	Trace (Note: Intermediate decay product of ^{235}U)
^{220}Rn	Thoron; Thorium emanation	86	134	220.0113924(19)	1900	55.6(1) s	α (Note: Theoretically capable of β^{−}β^{−} decay to ^{220}Ra)	^{216}Po	0+	Trace (Note: Intermediate decay product of ^{232}Th)
^{221}Rn		86	135	221.0155356(61)	1956	25.7(5) min	β^{−} (78%)	^{221}Fr	7/2+	Trace
^{221}Rn		86	135	221.0155356(61)	1956	25.7(5) min	α (22%)	^{217}Po	7/2+	Trace
^{222}Rn	Radon (Note: Source of element's name); Radium emanation Emanation; Emanon; Niton	86	136	222.0175760(21)	1899	3.8215(2) d	α (Note: Theoretically capable of β^{−}β^{−} decay to ^{222}Ra and perhaps β^{−} decay to ^{222}Fr)	^{218}Po	0+	Trace
^{223}Rn		86	137	223.0218893(84)	1964	24.3(4) min	β^{−} (Note: Theoretically capable of α decay to ^{219}Po with a partial half-life of ~3.65×10^{8} s (~11.6 y; branching ratio ~4×10^{−4}%))	^{223}Fr	7/2+	
^{224}Rn		86	138	224.024096(11)	1964	107(3) min	β^{−}	^{224}Fr	0+	
^{225}Rn		86	139	225.028486(12)	1969	4.66(4) min	β^{−}	^{225}Fr	7/2−	
^{226}Rn		86	140	226.030861(11)	1969	7.4(1) min	β^{−}	^{226}Fr	0+	
^{227}Rn		86	141	227.035304(15)	1986	20.2(4) s	β^{−}	^{227}Fr	(3/2+)	
^{228}Rn		86	142	228.037835(19)	1989	65(2) s	β^{−}	^{228}Fr	0+	
^{229}Rn		86	143	229.042257(14)	2009	11.9(13) s	β^{−}	^{229}Fr	(5/2+)	
^{230}Rn		86	144	230.04527(22)#	2010	24# s [>300 ns]			0+	
^{231}Rn		86	145	231.04997(32)#	2010	2# s [>300 ns]			1/2+#	
^{232}Rn		86	146		(2010)					
This table header & footer:
