= Mihran Kassabian =

Armenian-American physician (1870–1910)

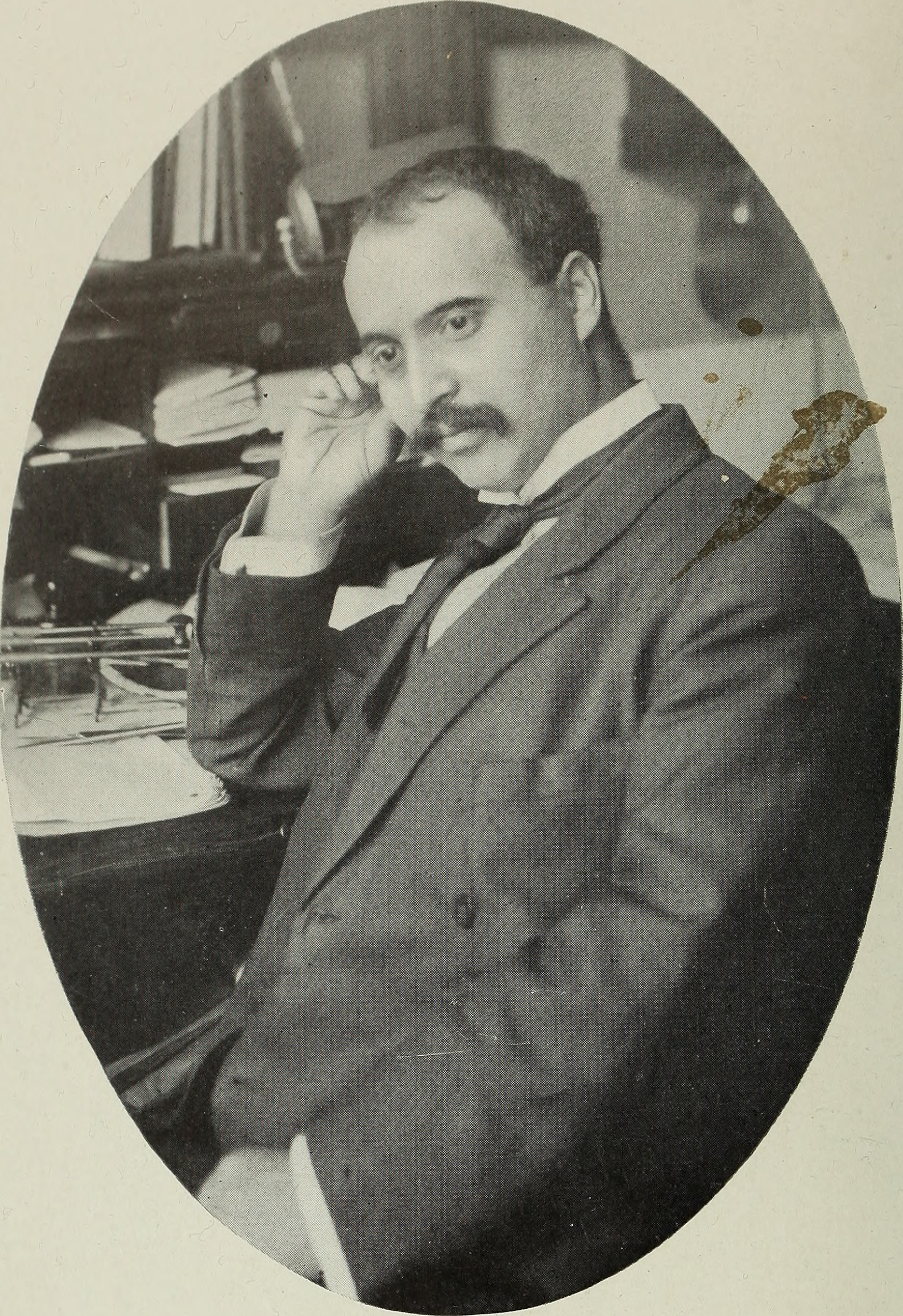
- Kassabian in 1909
- Born: August 25, 1870; Kayseri, Ottoman Empire
- Died: July 14, 1910 (aged 39); Philadelphia, Pennsylvania, US
- Citizenship: American
- Years active: 1898–1910
- Medical career
- Institutions: Philadelphia General Hospital
- Sub-specialties: Radiology

Mihran Krikor Kassabian (August 25, 1870 – July 14, 1910) (Note: Some sources list Kassabian's birth year as 1868 or describe him as 42 years old at the time of his death.) was an Armenian-American physician, one of the early investigators into the medical uses of X-rays, and a faculty member at the Medico-Chirurgical College of Philadelphia. He became director of the Roentgen Ray Laboratory at Philadelphia General Hospital and vice president of both the American Roentgen Ray Society (ARRS) and the American Electro-Therapeutic Association.

Born in Kayseri, Kassabian studied in London and Philadelphia before serving in the United States Army Hospital Corps during the Spanish–American War. After the war, he finished medical school at the Medico-Chirurgical College and became an instructor there. He invented a positioning device that displayed the ribs as round rather than flat on X-ray images. Kassabian had a special interest in the use of X-ray findings in court proceedings. He represented the American Medical Association at international conventions, and in 1907 he wrote an influential textbook on electrotherapeutics and radiology.

Kassabian's first published paper discussed the side effects of radiation, and he experienced these problems firsthand. Because he worked with X-rays every day in an era before lead shielding had been widely adopted, he sustained radiation burns to his hands, had two fingers amputated, and developed skin cancer within a few years of becoming a physician. The cancer spread across his body, leading to his death at age 39.

== Early life ==
Kassabian was born in Kayseri in the Cappadocia region of Asia Minor. He had three brothers, all of whom became jewelers in Smyrna. Kayseri and other cities in present-day Turkey lie on various fault lines, producing an unpredictable pattern of seismic activity. From 1884 to 1896, the Turkish government killed or encouraged the neighboring Kurds to kill more than 300,000 Armenians in the Ottoman Empire. Kassabian grew up in poverty and, as biographer Percy Brown put it, "with almost constant danger of earthquake or massacre" during his early years.

After attending the American Missionary Institute in Kayseri, Kassabian went to London in 1893 to study theology and medicine with the initial goal of becoming a missionary. In London, he developed a personal interest in photography, and he became much more interested in medicine than he did in theology. In 1894, he moved to the United States, where he attended medical school at the Medico-Chirurgical College of Philadelphia.

By 1898, Kassabian was a naturalized US citizen, and though he had nearly completed medical school, he took a hiatus from school in the spring of that year to join the United States Army Hospital Corps, serving in the Spanish–American War. It was during the war that Kassabian first gained experience with the use of X-rays, which had been discovered only a short time earlier by German engineer and physicist Wilhelm Röntgen. Kassabian was discharged from the Army Hospital Corps at the conclusion of the war. The conflict had been brief; before the end of 1898, Kassabian had returned to Philadelphia and received his medical degree.

== Career ==
=== Medico-Chirurgical College of Philadelphia ===
Early in his career, Kassabian worked as an instructor at the Medico-Chirurgical College. The first clinical X-ray had been taken in 1896, and Kassabian became interested in skiagraphy (an early term for radiography) soon after the appearance of X-ray machines in US hospitals. Photographers, engineers, and X-ray technicians had all begun to work with such machines, but Kassabian and his colleagues in the US and Europe lobbied to keep the devices under the direct control of physicians. Upon the introduction of X-ray machines, people could pose for X-ray "sittings" at studios run by photographers or artists. However, due to pressure from physicians like Kassabian, such studios closed within a few years, and the use of X-rays was limited to medical facilities.

At the time that Kassabian was becoming interested in skiagraphy, medical school administrators viewed physician skiagraphers more like photographers than medical professionals. In order to establish a legitimate medical school department that could devote attention to studying X-ray applications, Kassabian combined the practice of skiagraphy with work in the more established field of electrotherapeutics. He set up his X-ray facilities in the college's old operating theater. In his first two years of X-ray work at the college, Kassabian imaged more than 3,000 patients, and he developed about 800 X-ray images.

=== Philadelphia General Hospital ===
In 1902, Kassabian resigned from the college and took over as director of the Roentgen Ray Laboratory at Philadelphia General Hospital. The laboratory had been established in 1899 by George E. Pfahler, a resident physician. Pfahler had not been enthusiastic when the hospital's board of directors asked him to oversee the use of their new X-ray equipment; he believed that X-rays would not yield much new information. However, shortly before Kassabian's arrival, Pfahler's laboratory had made the second-ever X-ray diagnosis of a brain tumor.

Kassabian invented a positioning device for chest X-rays that displayed the roundness of the ribs; previously, X-ray images had rendered them as flat. In 1907, he reported his attempts to take X-rays of infants' hearts. The heart could not be seen on X-rays at that time, so Kassabian injected patients with a contrast agent, bismuth subnitrate. Kassabian hoped that as bismuth flowed through the heart, it would make the heart visible on X-ray. Due to the difficulty of controlling the contrast agent and the problems caused by the beating of the heart, his procedure did not become a standard medical practice. In 1908, he presented a paper before the American Medical Association on the uses of X-rays in the detection of neurologic conditions.

=== Influence ===
Kassabian wrote a textbook, Electro-therapeutics and Roentgen Rays (1907), which was used in American medical schools. The book was one of the earliest works on radiation therapy, and it covered the uses of radiation in treating conditions such as cancer, acne, varicose veins, migraine, tuberculosis, leprosy, and prostatic hypertrophy. The textbook included a detailed description of a series of 12 patients whose epilepsy was treated with radiation. A portion of the book covered forensic uses of radiology, and that helped to establish Kassabian as an expert witness in court. He served as chair of the medicolegal committee of the American Roentgen Ray Society (ARRS), and he believed that X-rays could reduce frivolous litigation by providing judges and juries with visual depictions of the medical information pertinent to court cases.

Kassabian served as a delegate of the American Medical Association at international conferences, and he was vice president of both the ARRS and the American Electro-Therapeutic Association. Outside of medicine, he served on the search committee that appointed the first pastor of the Armenian Martyrs' Congregational Church.

== Radiation-related injuries ==
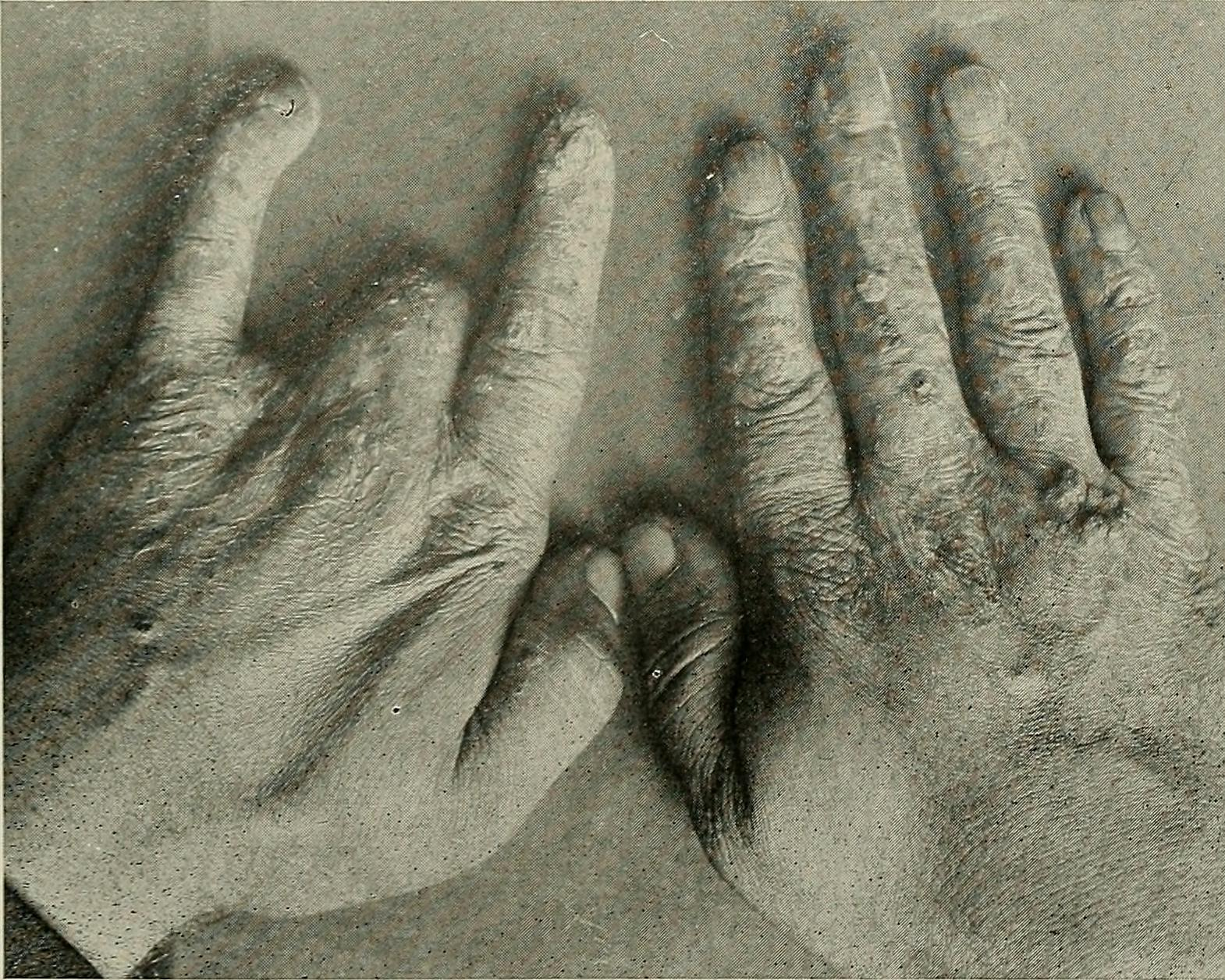
Kassabian's hands in 1909

Much of the early work of radiologists involved fluoroscopy, which allowed a body part to be examined through continuous X-ray exposure. Influential inventor Thomas Edison was involved in the development of the fluoroscope, and when President William McKinley was assassinated in 1901, physicians called for a fluoroscope to help locate the bullet. Work with fluoroscopy required Kassabian to be exposed to radiation for the duration of each patient's X-ray exam. While none of his patients were known to be injured by such exams, Kassabian received thousands of times more radiation than any individual patient.

Kassabian's first published paper, X-ray as an irritant (1900), drew on two years of experience with radiography exams at the college as well as his experience in the Spanish-American War. In that paper, he mentioned some radiation-related tissue injuries to his hands. Kassabian had first noted reddened areas of skin on his hands earlier that year. Initially, he thought that the issue was related to the use of metol in X-ray film development, but the problem persisted even after he began to handle metol with rubber gloves.

In 1902, Kassabian sustained serious radiation burns to his hands. Six years later, two fingers on his left hand became necrotic and had to be amputated. Kassabian kept a journal and took photographs of his hands as his tissue injuries progressed. He knew that his radiation-related problems did not represent an isolated case. His 1907 textbook included several pages of content on X-ray injuries, summarizing 12 lawsuits brought by radiation-injured patients against their doctors.

Kassabian was diagnosed with skin cancer, which was thought to be related to radiation exposure, in 1909. The cancer spread up Kassabian's arm. His physicians, who included Philadelphia surgeon William Williams Keen, performed surgery. He continued to work with vigor during his illness; he did not want his patients to know that he had been made ill by radiation exposure. Kassabian was acutely aware that some people experienced anxiety before undergoing X-ray studies. He had given conference presentations in which he discussed administering sedation to such patients. Lead shields were available for protection, but there were no standardized X-ray safety guidelines. Kassabian and most other radiologists did not practice shielding; they felt that lead aprons were impractical, unnecessary, or potentially distressing to patients. Kassabian even argued against the use of the word burns to describe radiation injuries, believing that such wording might alarm the public and stall the progress that was being made in the field.

== Death ==
In the spring of 1910, Kassabian had another cancer-related surgery, this time to remove affected muscle from his chest. On July 12, 1910, The New York Times reported that he was seriously ill. He had come to Jefferson Hospital about ten days earlier to have a dressing changed on his chest. During that visit, Kassabian collapsed and had to be admitted to a hospital room. Unnamed physicians at the hospital told the Times that Kassabian would not recover. He died on July 14. (Note: During the years when Kassabian was sustaining X-ray burns and being treated for cancer, other providers experienced similar problems, but few steps were taken to ensure practitioner safety. "The insurance companies are beginning to look upon us as undesirable risks," said radiologist George Johnson in 1909. Clarence Madison Dally, an assistant to Thomas Edison, was thought to represent the first death from chronic occupational exposure to X-rays in 1904. The next year, physician Elizabeth Fleischman became the first woman to die this way. X-ray pioneer Wolfram Conrad Fuchs died a couple of years later, and radiation-related physician deaths continued into at least the 1960s. The Monument to the X-ray and Radium Martyrs of All Nations in Hamburg included memorials to 359 "X-ray martyrs" worldwide by 1959.)

About 18 months before his death, Kassabian had married Virginia Giragosian from Constantinople. His nephew Leo, 16 years old at the time of Kassabian's death, decided to pursue the study of skiagraphy. Shortly before Kassabian died, the J. B. Lippincott Company announced that it would publish a second edition of his textbook.
