= Bateman equation =

Mathematical model in nuclear physics

In nuclear physics, the Bateman equation is a mathematical model describing abundances and activities in a decay chain as a function of time, based on the decay rates and initial abundances. The model was formulated by Ernest Rutherford in 1905 and the analytical solution was provided by Harry Bateman in 1910.

If, at time t, there are $N_i(t)$ atoms of isotope $i$ that decays into isotope $i+1$ at the rate $\lambda_i$, the amounts of isotopes in the k-step decay chain evolves as:

$$\begin{align}
\frac{dN_1(t)}{dt} & =-\lambda_1 N_1(t) \\[3pt]
\frac{dN_i(t)}{dt} & =-\lambda_i N_i(t) + \lambda_{i-1}N_{i-1}(t) \\[3pt]
\frac{dN_k(t)}{dt} & = \lambda_{k-1}N_{k-1}(t)
\end{align}$$

(this can be adapted to handle decay branches). While this can be solved explicitly for i = 2, the formulas quickly become cumbersome for longer chains. The Bateman equation is a classical master equation where the transition rates are only allowed from one species (i) to the next (i+1) but never in the reverse sense (i+1 to i is forbidden).

Bateman found a general explicit formula for the amounts by taking the Laplace transform of the variables.

$$N_n(t)=N_1(0)\times\left(\prod_{i=1}^{n-1}\lambda_i\right)\times\sum_{i=1}^n\frac{e^{-\lambda_i t}}{\prod\limits_{j=1,j\neq i}^{n}\left(\lambda_j-\lambda_i\right)}$$

(it can also be expanded with source terms, if more atoms of isotope i are provided externally at a constant rate).

Quantity calculation with the Bateman-Function for plutonium-241

While the Bateman formula can be implemented in a computer code, if $\lambda_j \approx \lambda_i$ for some isotope pair, catastrophic cancellation can lead to computational errors. Therefore, other methods such as numerical integration or the matrix exponential method are also in use.

For example, for the simple case of a chain of three isotopes the corresponding Bateman equation reduces to

$$\begin{align}
& A \,\xrightarrow{\lambda_A}\, B \,\xrightarrow{\lambda_B}\, C \\[4pt]
& N_B= \frac{\lambda_A}{\lambda_B-\lambda_A}N_{A_0} \left( e^{-\lambda_A t} - e^{-\lambda_B t} \right)
\end{align}$$

Which gives the following formula for activity of isotope $B$ (by substituting $A=\lambda N$)

$$\begin{align}
A_B= \frac{\lambda_B}{\lambda_B-\lambda_A}A_{A_0} \left( e^{-\lambda_A t} - e^{-\lambda_B t} \right)
\end{align}$$

== Fission-product buildup and decay ==
During the operation of a live nuclear reactor the production of fission products is proportional to the fission rate and their removal is achieved through radioactive decay and neutron capture. For a nuclide $i$ with fission yield $\gamma_i$, the rate of change of the abundance is described by

$$\frac{dN_i}{dt} = \gamma_i N_f \sigma_f \phi + N_j \sigma_j \phi + \lambda_k N_k - N_i \sigma_i \phi - \lambda_i N_i ,$$

where $N_f$, $\sigma_f$, and $\phi$ are the number density of the fissile species, its fission cross section, and the neutron flux, $\sigma_i$ is the capture cross section of the nuclide itself, and the terms in $N_j$ and $N_k$ describe feeding by neutron capture in the neighbouring isotope and by decay of the parent. For some fission products (such as strontium-90 and iodine-131) only the first and last terms are significant, so the abundance approaches the saturation value $N_i(\mathrm{sat}) \approx \gamma_i N_f \sigma_f \phi / \lambda_i$ at a rate controlled by the nuclide's own half-life,

$$\frac{N_i(t)}{N_i(\mathrm{sat})} \approx 1 - e^{-\lambda_i t} ,$$

meaning a short-lived product reaches saturation within a few half-lives of operation while a long-lived one does not. Iodine-131 ($t_{1/2} = 8.05$ d) gets close to its saturation activity after a month of operation, which contrasts with strontium-90 which still grows almost linearly even after a year because of its longer half-life of about 29 years, remaining far from its saturation point.

The concentration of daughter nuclides can be calculated using coupled balance equations that account for the production and removal through fission, radioactive decay, and neutron capture. This can be exemplified by xenon-135, formed directly in uranium-235 fission with a yield of 0.002 and for the most part by decay of iodine-135, which is itself fed through tellurium-135 and antimony-135; because those precursors decay in a short time, their yields are folded into a single iodine yield of 0.061. With $\Sigma_f$ the macroscopic fission cross section, $\lambda_I$ and $\lambda_X$ the decay constants of iodine-135 and xenon-135, and $\sigma_I$ and $\sigma_X$ their thermal-neutron absorption cross sections, the concentrations of the two nuclides in a homogeneous thermal reactor obey

$$\frac{dI}{dt} = -\lambda_I I - \sigma_I \phi I + \gamma_I \Sigma_f \phi ,$$

$$\frac{dX}{dt} = -\lambda_X X - \sigma_X \phi X + \lambda_I I + \gamma_X \Sigma_f \phi .$$

After shutdown the flux gets close to zero, the burning of xenon stops (so the burnup term goes away), and the xenon concentration becomes

$$X(t_s) = \frac{\lambda_I}{\lambda_X - \lambda_I} I_0 \left(e^{-\lambda_I t_s} - e^{-\lambda_X t_s}\right) + X_0 e^{-\lambda_X t_s} ,$$

where $I_0$ and $X_0$ are the equilibrium iodine-135 and xenon-135 concentrations at shutdown (which is obtained by running the reactor for some time). This is the two-isotope Bateman solution with an initial amount $X_0$ of the daughter. Because iodine-135 decays faster than xenon-135, the xenon concentration continues rising after shutdown; the peak happens at

$$t_\mathrm{max} = \frac{1}{\lambda_X - \lambda_I} \ln\left[\frac{\lambda_X}{\lambda_I}\left(1 - \frac{\lambda_X - \lambda_I}{\lambda_I} \frac{X_0}{I_0}\right)\right] ,$$

around 10 to 11 hours after shutdown in a thermal reactor (after which the xenon decays away).

The time dependence changes when there is a stable daughter instead of a decaying one. Promethium-149 feeds samarium-149, which is stable, so it accumulates after shutdown instead of going through a peak, rising over about 20 days by the amount of promethium-149 that was in the core at shutdown. The coupled equations for the complete set of fission products in the core can be solved computationally; nevertheless, the total rate of beta emission can be approximated semiempirically by $3.2 t^{-1.2}$ beta particles per fission per second, where $t$ is the time in seconds after the fission event; it is a good approximation from about 10 seconds to 100 days after shutdown.

== See also ==
- Harry Bateman
- List of equations in nuclear and particle physics
- Transient equilibrium
- Secular equilibrium
- Pharmacokinetics, loose applicability
