= Anshel Brusilow discography =

Anshel Brusilow (14 August 1928 – 15 January 2018) was an American violinist, conductor, and music educator at the collegiate level.

== Extant discography ==
=== As violinist ===
Philadelphia Orchestra

1. The Romantic Philadelphia Strings (1970)
  Recorded February 14, 1966, Town Hall, Philadelphia
  Eugene Ormandy, conductor
  Anshel Brusilow, violin soloist (1st work)
  1 of 10 tracks
  1. Massenet: "Meditation" from the opera Thaïs (RAK No. 1136)
  Thomas Frost, producer
  Columbia MS 7103 (LP)
  Columbia M 30066 (LP)
  OCLC 6407768
  The Massenet was also released on the LP:
  Greensleeves
  CBS SBR 235276
  OCLC 6407768
2. Collection: First Chair Encores, Vol. 1 (1961) Eugene Ormandy, conductor
  Anshel Brusilow, violin soloist (1st work)
  The original LP was sold to benefit the Philadelphia Orchestra pension fund
  1 of 7 tracks
  1. Sarasate: Introduction and Tarantelle for Violin and Orchestra, Op. 43 (RAK No. 930)
  Columbia ML 6191 / MS 6791 (LPs)
  Haydn House HH 2008-309 (CD)
  OCLC 30499626, 6234060, 5921837; OCLC 859389078
3. Philadelphia Orchestra – Ormandy (1961)
  Recorded December 15, 1960, Manhattan Center, New York
  Eugene Ormandy, conductor
  Anshel Brusilow, violin soloist
  Ein Heldenleben, Op. 40 (RAK No. 896)
  1. "Der Held (The Hero)
  2. "Des Helden Widersacher" ("The Hero's Adversaries")
  3. "Des Helden Gefährtin" ("The Hero's Helpmate")
  4. "Des Helden Walstatt" ("The Hero's Battlefield") (beginning)
  5. "Des Helden Walstatt" ("The Hero's Battlefield") (conclusion)
  6. "Des Helden Friedenswerke" ("The Hero's Works of Peace")
  7. "Des Helden Weltflucht Und Vollendung" ("The Hero's Escape From The World And His Fulfillment")
  Columbia Masterworks MS 6249 (US; 1961)
  Columbia Masterworks ML 5649 (US; 1961)
  CBS SBRG 72030 (UK; 1961)
  Odyssey Y 31922
  OCLC 3618748, 695705007, 695705007
4. Philadelphia Orchestra – Ormandy (1961)
  Recorded February 11, 1962, Town Hall, Philadelphia (Note: The Town Hall in Philadelphia, also known as the "Scottish Rite Temple" – located at 150 North Broad Street (NWC or Broad and Race Streets) – was designed by architect Horace William Castor (1870–1966). The building opened in 1926 and, after 55 years, was demolished in 1983 to make way for a parking garage. The facility housed a 1,692 seat auditorium with bright resonant acoustics that were well-suited for high fidelity recordings. The Philadelphia Orchestra, under Eugene Ormandy recorded there.)
  Eugene Ormandy, conductor
  Anshel Bursilow, violin soloist
  Rimsky-Korsakov: Scheherazade, Op. 35 (RAK No. 965)
  1. "The Sea And Sinbad's Ship"
  2. "The Story of the Kalandar Prince"
  3. "The Young Prince and the Young Princess"
  4. "The Festival at Bagdad;" "The Sea;" "The Ship Goes To Pieces On A Rock Surmounted By A Bronze Warrior;" Conclusion
  Robert Frost, producer
  Catalog No.: Columbia MS 6365 (LP)
  Side A: Matrix No. (label) – XSM 56842
  Side B: Matrix No. (label) – XSM 56843
  Side A: Matrix No. (stamped in runout) – XXSM-56842-1DG T
  Side B: Matrix No. (stamped in runout) – XXSM-56843-1CG T
  Columbia Masterworks ML 5765 (LP)
  Franklin Mint 6011/15 (LP)
  Odyssey MBK 39786 (CD)
  Sony SBK 46537 (CD) (see "Compilations" below)
  Sony SBK 89956 (CD)
  Sony 88697-27987-2 (10)
  Sony (Japan) SICC 1681
  CBS CBS 72075
  CBS CBS 61044
  Embassy Classics S CBS 30095
  OCLC 6442685
5. Richard Yardumian, Philadelphia Orchestra (1963)
  Recorded April 15, 1954, Academy of Music, Philadelphia
  Philadelphia Orchestra
  Eugene Ormandy, conductor
  Anshel Brusilow, violin (2nd work)
  Howell Zulick, tenor solo (4th work)
  Cover art: Doris Lee
  Yardumian, composer
  1. Armenian Suite (RAK No. 632)
  2. Concerto for Violin and Orchestra (RAK No. 634)
  3. "Desolate City" (RAK No. 633)
  4. Psalm No. 130 (RAK No. 635)
  Columbia Masterworks ML 4991
  Side A: Matrix No. (label) – XLP 31728
  Side B: Matrix No. (label) – XLP 31729
  Side A: Matrix No. (stamped in runout) – XLP 31728-1D
  Side B: Matrix No. (stamped in runout) – XLP 31729-1A
  OCLC 4031206
6. Richard Yardumian, Philadelphia Orchestra
  Recorded November 21, 1960, Academy of Music, Philadelphia
  Eugene Ormandy, conductor
  Anshel Brusilow, violin
  John McClure, producer
  1 of 2 works
  1. Concerto for Violin and Orchestra (RAK No. 892)
  Columbia ML 5862 (LP)
  Side A: Matrix No. (label) – XLP 59375
  Side B: Matrix No. (label) – XLP 59376
  OCLC 10070290, 401722428
7. Philadelphia Orchestra (1966) (RAK No. 961)
  Recorded January 28, 1962, Town Hall, Philadelphia
  Eugene Ormandy, conductor
  Anshel Brusilow, violin
  1. Bartók: Suite From "The Miraculous Mandarin", Op. 19
  2. Bartók: "Deux Images" ("Two Pictures"), Op. 10
  3. Bartók: "Two Portraits," Op. 5
  Thomas Frost, producer
  Columbia Masterworks MS 6789
  CBS SBRG 72445
  Columbia Masterworks ML 6189
  CBS BRG 72445
  OCLC 608017431, 611282099
8. Philadelphia Orchestra – Vivaldi (1961) (RAK No. 879)
  Eugene Ormandy, conductor
  Anshel Brusilow, violin
  Program notes by David W. B. Johnson
9. Vivaldi: The Seasons (arr. by Gian Francesco Malipiero) (LP, RE) Columbia Masterworks MS 6195 Unknown
  (LP) Columbia Masterworks ML 5595
  (CD, RM) CBS Odyssey MBK 44813
  Columbia Masterworks OS-138
  OCLC 3394582

Bournemouth Symphony Orchestra

10. Bournemouth Symphony Orchestra (1976)
  Anshel Brusilow, conductor
  1. Yardumian: Armenian Suite
  2. Yardumian: Cantus Animae et Cordis for Strings
  3. Yardumian: Symphony No. 1
  EMI EMD 5527
  OCLC 960979688, 865159920, 4238896

Selected compilations; as violinist

12. The Philadelphia Orchestra: Rimsky-Korsakov (1991; 2002)
  Eugene Ormandy, conductor
  1. Scheherazade, Op. 35 (RAK No. 965)
    Recorded February 11, 1962, Town Hall, Philadelphia
    Brusilow, violin soloist
  2. Russian Easter Festival Overture, Op. 36
    Recorded April 1, 1959, Broadwood Hotel, Philadelphia
  3. Capriccio espagnol, Op. 34
    Recorded February 17, 1966, Town Hall, Philadelphia
  Catalog No.: Sony Essential Classics SBK 46537
  OCLC 225738531, 1014036706, 51225386

=== As conductor ===
Chamber Symphony of Philadelphia

13. Chamber Symphony of Philadelphia (1968)
  Anshel Brusilow, conductor
  1. Tchaikovsky: Orchestral Suite No. 4 "Mozartiana" / Andante Cantabile (from Op. 11) -
  2. Arensky: Variations on a Theme of Tchaikovsky, Op. 35a
  RCA Victor RCA Red Seal LSC 3020
  OCLC 8567403, 81065300, 1013302997
14. Chamber Symphony of Philadelphia (1967)
  1. Brahms: Serenade in D, Op. 11
  (LP) RCA Victor Red Seal LSC 2976
  OCLC 2820585, 4340918
15. Chamber Symphony of Philadelphia (1969)
  Anshel Brusilow, conductor
  Cover artist: Mozelle Willmont Thompson, Jr. (1926–1969)
  1. Ravel: Le tombeau de Couperin
  2. Françaix: Serenade for Small Orchestra
  3. Ibert: Suite Symphonique
  4. Ibert: Capriccio
  RCA Red Seal LSC 3089
  OCLC 611857995
16. Chamber Symphony of Philadelphia (1969)
  Anshel Brusilow, conductor
  Side A: Strauss: Le Bourgeois Gentilhomme, Suite
  1. Overture ("Jourdain the Bourgeois")
  2. "Minuet"
  3. "The Fencing Master"
  4. "Entrance and Dance of the Tailors"
  5. "The Minuet of Lully"
  6. "Courante"
  7. "Cléonte's Entry"
  8. Prelude to Act II (Intermezzo)
  Side B: Le Bourgeois Gentilhomme (continued)
  9. "The Dinner"
  Wolf: Italian Serenade
  (LP) RCA Red Seal LSC-3087 (1969)
  OCLC 742019334
17. Dallasound (1971)
  Paul Guerrero (1931–1989), drums
  Jack Petersen, guitar
  Al Wesar (1926–2014), (Note: Al Wesar (aka "Little Al," né Alfonso Alejandro Wesar; 1926–2014) was a jazz bassist from Dallas, Texas, who also played percussion with the Dallas Symphony. ("Alfonso Wesar," obituary, Dallas Morning News, June 1, 2014)) Fender bass
  Dallas Symphony Orchestra
  Anshel Brusilow, conductor
  Wilfred Holcombe (1924–2010), arranger (Note: Wilfred Holcombe (aka Bill Holcombe, né Wilford Lawshe Holcombe Jr.; 1924–2010), from Trenton, New Jersey, was an arranger and composer for recording dates and symphony orchestras and, for many years, pursued a parallel career as a professional woodwind doubler.)
  Side A:
  1. Overture to Rock, by Wilfred Holcombe (1924–2010)
  2. "Something"
  3. "We've Only Just Begun"
  4. "My Sweet Lord"
  Side B:
  1. "MacArthur Park"
  2. "Light My Fire"
  3. "It's Not Unusual"
  4. "Delilah"
  Dallasound (record label) DSD 10001
  Matrix No. (label) A4RS-0032
  OCLC 7438916

=== As violinist in an ensemble ===
18. Night Journey (℗1976) (Note: Shortly after Night Journey was released, the president of Epic Records, Steve Popovich, who had championed the project, resigned and, according to Larry White (steel guitarist on one of the tracks, "I Wanna' Be With You"), none of the new regime at Epic cared. The album, in White's view, was doomed from a lack promotion. ("Steeling for a Living," blog of Larry White, April 9, 2017; retrieved January 24, 2018))
  Doc Severinsen Orchestra
  Recorded around 1975 at Dallasonic Recording, Dallas, Texas (Note: Dallasonic Recording Studios, in Dallas, Texas, was founded October 16, 1972, by Donald Charles Allman (1921–1976) and his son-in-law, Don Smith (né William Donald Smith, Jr.; 1951–2010), who was President. Thom Caccetta (né Thomas Caccetta; born 1946), who, with Don Smith, engineered the album, is a notable audio engineer.)
  Brusilow is violinist in the orchestra
  Epic PE 34078
  OCLC 5341472
