= Secular equilibrium =

Situation in which the quantity of a radioactive isotope remains constant

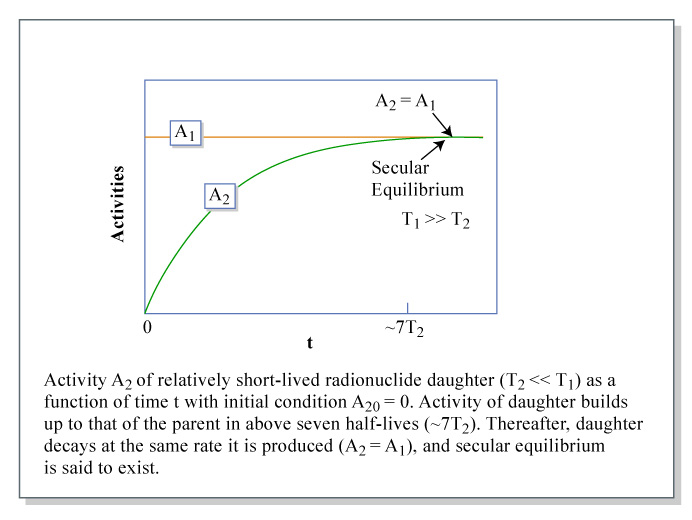
Graph illustrating secular equilibrium, where lines of A1 and A2 meet.

In nuclear physics, secular equilibrium is a situation in which the quantity of a radioactive isotope remains constant because its production rate (e.g., due to decay of a parent isotope) is equal to its decay rate. An example of this is the germanium-68/gallium-68 generator commonly used for the preparation of gallium-68 radiopharmaceuticals for PET imaging.

== In radioactive decay ==
Secular equilibrium can occur in a radioactive decay chain only if the half-life of the daughter radionuclide B is much shorter than the half-life of the parent radionuclide A. In such a case, the decay rate of A and hence the production rate of B is approximately constant, because the half-life of A is very long compared to the time scales considered. The quantity of radionuclide B builds up until the number of B atoms decaying per unit time becomes equal to the number being produced per unit time. The quantity of radionuclide B then reaches a constant, equilibrium value. Assuming the initial concentration of radionuclide B is zero, full equilibrium usually takes several half-lives of radionuclide B to establish.

The quantity of radionuclide B when secular equilibrium is reached is determined by the quantity of its parent A and the half-lives of the two radionuclide. That can be seen from the time rate of change of the number of atoms of radionuclide B:

$$\frac{dN_B}{dt} = \lambda_A N_A - \lambda_B N_B,$$

where λ_{A} and λ_{B} are the decay constants of radionuclide A and B, related to their half-lives t_{1/2} by $\lambda = \ln(2)/t_{1/2}$, and N_{A} and N_{B} are the number of atoms of A and B at a given time.

Secular equilibrium occurs when $dN_B/dt = 0$, or

$$N_B = \frac{\lambda_A}{\lambda_B} N_A.$$

Over long enough times, comparable to the half-life of radionuclide A, the secular equilibrium is only approximate; N_{A} decays away according to

$$N_A(t) = N_A(0) e^{-\lambda_A t},$$

and the "equilibrium" quantity of radionuclide B declines in turn. For times short compared to the half-life of A, $\lambda_A t \ll 1$ and the exponential can be approximated as 1.

== See also ==
- Bateman equation
- Transient equilibrium
