= Decay correction =

Decay correction is a method of estimating the amount of radioactive decay at some set time before it was actually measured.

== Example of use ==
Researchers often want to measure, say, medical compounds in the bodies of animals. It's hard to measure them directly, so it can be chemically joined to a radionuclide - by measuring the radioactivity, you can get a good idea of how the original medical compound is being processed.

Samples may be collected and counted at short time intervals (ex: 1 and 4 hours). But they might be tested for radioactivity all at once. Decay correction is one way of working out what the radioactivity would have been at the time it was taken, rather than at the time it was tested.

For example, the isotope copper-64, commonly used in medical research, has a half-life of 12.7 hours. If you inject a large group of animals at "time zero", but measure the radioactivity in their organs at two later times, the later groups must be "decay corrected" to adjust for the decay that has occurred between the two time points.

== Mathematics ==
The formula for decay correcting is: $A_t = {A_0}*{e^{-\lambda t}}$

where $A_0$ is the original activity count at time zero, $A_t$ is the activity at time "t", "λ" is the decay constant, and "t" is the elapsed time.

The decay constant is $\frac{\ln(2)}{t_{1/2}}$ where "$t_{1/2}$" is the half-life of the radioactive material of interest.

== Example ==
The decay correct might be used this way: a group of 20 animals is injected with a compound of interest on a Monday at 10:00 a.m. The compound is chemically joined to the isotope copper-64, which has a known half-life of 12.7 hours, or 764 minutes. After one hour, the 5 animals in the "one hour" group are killed, dissected, and organs of interest are placed in sealed containers to await measurement. This is repeated for another 5 animals, at 2 hours, and again at 4 hours. At this point, (say, 4:00 p.m., Monday) all the organs collected so far are measured for radioactivity (a proxy of the distribution of the compound of interest). The next day (Tuesday), the "24 hour" group would be killed and dissected at 10:00 a.m., then measured for radioactivity, (say at 11:00 a.m.). In order to compare ALL the groups together, the data from the "24 hour" must be decay corrected: the radioactivity measured on the second day must be "adjusted" in order to allow a comparison to measurements from an earlier time, but of the same original material.

In this case, "time zero" is Monday, 4:00 p.m., when the first three groups (1,2, and 4 hour animals organs) were measured. The "24 hour" group was measured at 11:00 a.m. Tuesday, which is 19 hours after the first groups.

Start by calculating the decay constant "K". Substitute 12.7 (hours, the half-life of copper-64) for $t_{1/2}$, giving ${0.693 \over 12.7}$ = 0.0546.

Next, multiply this value of "K" by the time elapsed between the first and second measures of radioactivity, 19 hours: (0.0546 x 19) = 1.0368.

Change the sign, to make it -1.0368, then find the "inverse Ln"; in this case 0.3546.

This value is in the denominator of the decay correcting fraction, so it is the same as multiplying the numerator by its inverse (${1 \over 0.3546}$), which is 2.82.

(A simple way to check if you are using the decay correct formula right is to put in the value of the half-life in place of "t". After you perform the inverse Ln, the value should be very close to 0.5. When divided into the value "A" (for uncorrected counts), it effectively doubles them, which is the necessary correction after one half-life has occurred.)

In this case, the uncorrected values will be multiplied by 2.82, which corrects for 19 hours elapsing (between one and two half-lives).

If the radiation measured has dropped by half between the 4 hour sample and the 24 hour sample we might think that the concentration of compound in that organ has dropped by half; but applying the decay correct we see that the concentration is 0.5*2.82 so it has actually increased by 40% in that period.
