= Richard Yardumian =

Armenian-American classical music composer

- Born: April 5, 1917; Philadelphia, Pennsylvania
- Died: August 15, 1985 (aged 68); Bryn Athyn, Pennsylvania
- Occupation: Composer
- Children: 13

Richard Yardumian (Armenian: Ռիչարդ Յարդումյան; April 5, 1917 – August 15, 1985) was an Armenian-American classical music composer.

== Life ==
Yardumian was born in Philadelphia, Pennsylvania, the youngest of ten children to Armenian immigrant parents, and began studying the piano at a very early age. His mother, Lucia, was a teacher and organist, and his father, Rev Haig Yardumian, was the founding pastor of the Philadelphia Armenian Evangelical community, which later became the Armenian Martyrs' Congregational Church, now located in Havertown, Pennsylvania.

Very little has been written about Yardumian's early life, but it is known that his family's household was busy and musical. Elijah Yardumian, a concert pianist and a product of the Curtis Institute, served as a musical mentor to his younger brother Richard, who began composing at age 14 and began a formal study of piano, harmony, theory and counterpoint at age 21. He was only 19 when he wrote his most popular piece, The Armenian Suite.

This work, later recorded by the Philadelphia Orchestra, the Utah Symphony, the Bournemouth Symphony, and the Singapore Symphony Orchestra, was also used as the signature theme for the Voice of America radio program Behind the Iron Curtain. Yardumian's earlier compositions frequently reflect the Armenian folk songs and religious melodies he was exposed to as a child.

The Great Depression of the 1930s precluded advanced formal music training for Yardumian, but he continued to progress on his own time. He was a private in the army during World War II when, in 1945, Eugene Ormandy and the Philadelphia Orchestra premiered Desolate City, which marked Yardumian's debut as a composer. This was also the beginning of his long association with Ormandy, which led to several recordings on the Columbia label.

Throughout the history of their relationship, the Philadelphia Orchestra premiered ten of Yardumian's works, bringing the total of known performances worldwide to nearly 100. This number includes the performances of his Story of Abraham, a multi-media composition that included the broadcast of André Girard's unique hand-painted 70mm film sequences.

In 1967, Fordham University, in celebration of its 125th anniversary, commissioned Yardumian to write his mass, Come Creator Spirit, which was premiered at Lincoln Center that year with mezzo-soprano Lili Chookasian. This rarely performed piece is considered to be musically complex and an interesting contribution to the Catholic musical canon as it was written by a Protestant composer.

In the 1950s, Yardumian began writing hymns for The Lord's New Church Which Is Nova Hierosolyma, a Swedenborgian congregation, in Bryn Athyn, Pennsylvania, a church he later joined and for which he became musical director.

== Death ==
Yardumian died of complications following a heart attack at home in Bryn Athyn, Pennsylvania on August 15, 1985. He was the father of thirteen children, including pianist Vera Yardumian, painter Nishan Yardumian and teacher Esther Yardumian.

== Selected recordings ==
- Armenian Suite ()
- Cantus animae et cordis for strings (1955) () (recorded by Eugene Ormandy and the Philadelphia Orchestra in string orchestra form ())
- Chorale-prelude on plainsong Veni Sancte Spiritus, for orchestra ()
- Flute Quintet (1951)
- Symphony No. 1 (1950), No. 2 Psalms for medium voice and orchestra (written 1947-64 )
- Violin Concerto (1949, revised 1960) ()
- Passacaglia, Recitative and Fugue for piano and orchestra (1957; played by John Ogdon in concert and recorded by him twice: with the Royal Philharmonic Orchestra under Igor Buketoff; and the Bournemouth Symphony Orchestra under Paavo Berglund).
- Chromatic sonata (1946; recorded by John Ogdon on HMV SLS 868)

== Discography ==
- 1960. Passacaglia, Recitative, and Fugue; Cantus Animae et Cordis; Chorale-Prelude. Philadelphia Orchestra: Eugene Ormandy conducting; John Pennink, piano. (Columbia Masterworks MS 6229/ML 5629; LP).
- 1963. Symphony No. 1; Violin Concerto. Philadelphia Orchestra: Eugene Ormandy conducting; Anshel Brusilow, violin. (Columbia Masterworks MS 6462 / ML 5862; LP).
- 1964. Symphony No. 2; Symphony No. 1; Chorale-Prelude. Philadelphia Orchestra: Eugene Ormandy conducting; Lili Chookasian, mezzo-soprano. (Columbia Masterworks MS 6859; LP).
- 1967. Symphony No. 2 "Psalms". Finnish Radio Symphony Orchestra: Jussi Jalas conducting; Maiju Kuusoja, mezzo-soprano. (Finlandia Classics FINCLA 26; CD).
- 1967. Come, Creator Spirit: a new Mass in English. Chamber Symphony of Philadelphia, Anshel Brusilow conducting (RCA Victor LSC-2979, LP).
- 1976. Armenian Suite; Cantus Animae et Cordis; Symphony No. 1. Bournemouth Symphony, Anshel Brusilow conducting. (EMI EMD 5527; in USA, HNH Records 4043; LP).
- 1979. Two Preludes: Wind, Sky. Şahan Arzruni, piano. (Musical Heritage Society 4110; LP.)
- 1981. Symphony No. 2 "Psalms" and Armenian Suite. Utah Symphony Orchestra (Varese Sarabande 704.130).
