= Transient equilibrium =

In nuclear physics, transient equilibrium is a situation in which equilibrium is reached by a parent-daughter radioactive isotope pair where the half-life of the daughter is shorter than the half-life of the parent. Contrary to secular equilibrium, the half-life of the daughter is not negligible compared to parent's half-life. An example of this is a molybdenum-99 generator producing technetium-99 for nuclear medicine diagnostic procedures. Such a generator is sometimes called a cow because the daughter product, in this case technetium-99, is milked at regular intervals. Transient equilibrium occurs after four half-lives, on average.

== Activity in transient equilibrium ==
The activity of the daughter is given by the Bateman equation:

$$A_d = A_P(0)\frac{\lambda_d}{\lambda_d-\lambda_P} \times (e^{-\lambda_Pt}-e^{-\lambda_dt}) \times BR  + A_d(0)e^{-\lambda_dt},$$

where $A_P$ and $A_d$ are the activity of the parent and daughter, respectively. $T_P$ and $T_d$ are the half-lives (inverses of reaction rates $\lambda$ in the above equation modulo ln(2)) of the parent and daughter, respectively, and BR is the branching ratio.

In transient equilibrium, the Bateman equation cannot be simplified by assuming the daughter's half-life is negligible compared to the parent's half-life. The ratio of daughter-to-parent activity is given by:

$$\frac{A_d}{A_P} = \frac{T_P}{T_P-T_d} \times BR.$$

== Time of maximum daughter activity ==
In transient equilibrium, the daughter activity increases and eventually reaches a maximum value that can exceed the parent activity. The time of maximum activity is given by:

$$t_{\max} = \frac{1.44 \times T_P T_d}{T_P-T_d} \times \ln\frac{T_P}{T_d},$$

where $T_P$ and $T_d$ are the half-lives of the parent and daughter, respectively. In the case of $\ce{^{99\!m}Tc-^{99}Mo}$ generator, the time of maximum activity ($t_{\max}$) is approximately 24 hours, which makes it convenient for medical use.

== See also ==
- Bateman equation
- Secular equilibrium
