= United States Army Hospital Corps =

Former staff corps of the U.S. Army Medical Department

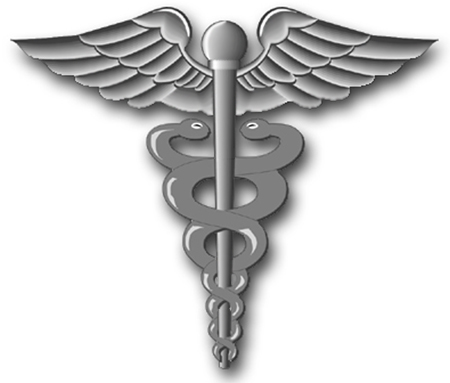
- Active: 1886–1916
- Country: USA
- Branch: United States Army Medical Department
- Type: Enlisted corps
- Role: Medical orderlies, Field medics

United States Army Hospital Corps was organized in 1886 in order to recruit and retain competent medical enlisted personnel in the United States Army Medical Department for field service in the event of a foreign war. Existing Hospital Stewards were not trained to perform duties as field medical personnel. The Corps was recruited from enlisted men who had served one year in the line. After training they were transferred to a post where they would be assigned duties as nurse, cook or medical attendant. Privates having served twelve months in the Corps could be recommended for promotion. Having passed an examination they were promoted to Acting Hospital Stewards (Sergeant). Promotion to full Hospital Steward (Sergeant First Class) was possible after one year's service in an acting capacity and after having passed a second and more rigorous examination. The peak strength of the Corps was reached in November 1898, during the Spanish–American War, with about 6,000 men serving in the Corps.

== Background and Formation ==
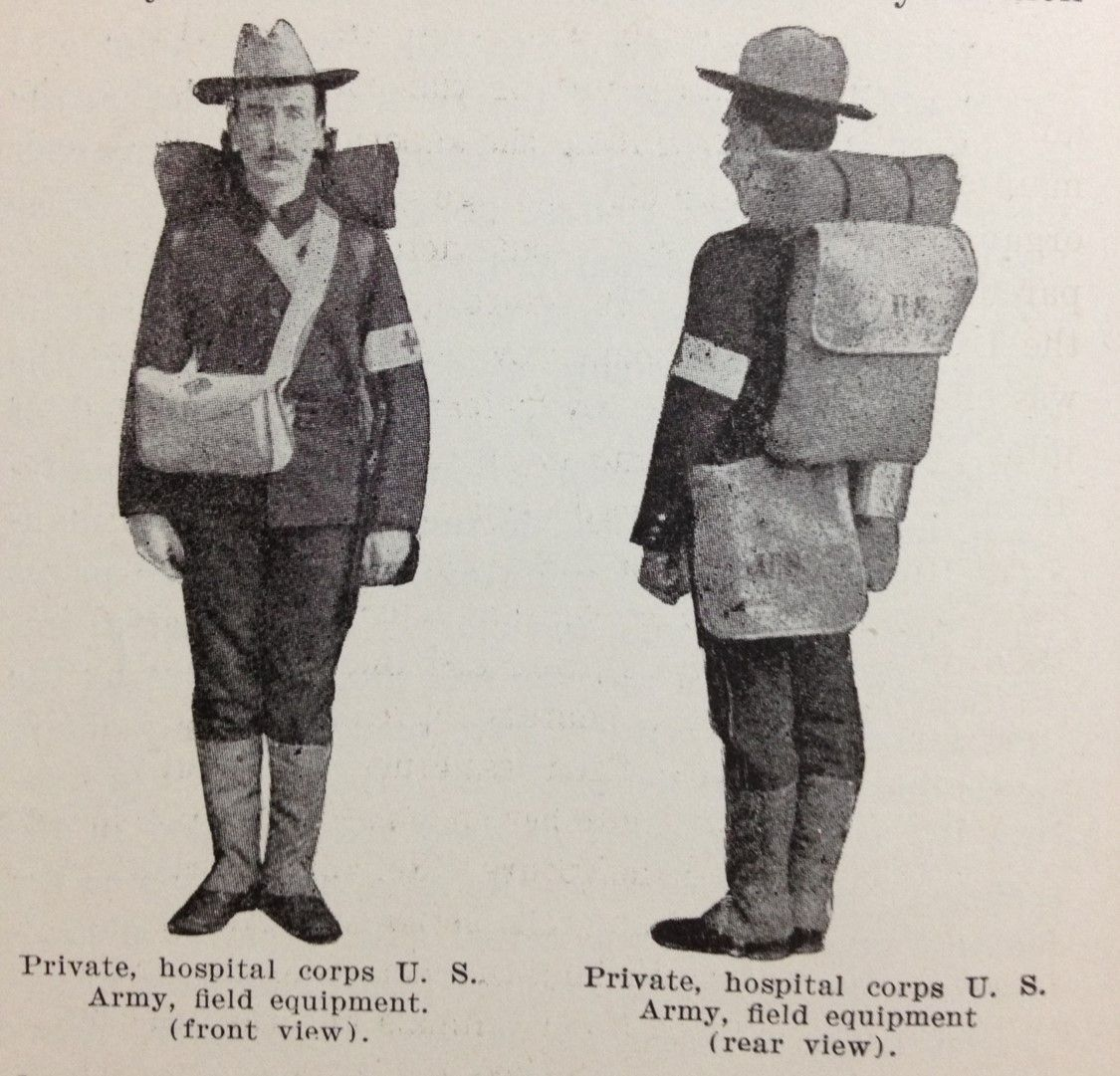
Private of the Hospital Corps with field equipment, 1892.

The hospital corps was organized in order to enlist and retain competent medical personnel below officer rank. Hospital Stewards belonged to the Army Medical Department, performing tasks within the fields of pharmacy, minor surgery, simple dentistry and administration, as well as managing the army's post hospitals. They were enlisted by the Medical Department for service at specific posts, and were not trained for field service. The end of the Indian Wars being in sight, the U.S. Army at the end of the 1870s began to pay increased attention to the likelihood of a foreign war. The lack of trained medical personnel was seen as a major deficiency in the case of war, and the Surgeon General started a campaign to create an enlisted corps of medical attendants that could be trained for field service. Subsequently, the Congress created the United States Army Hospital Corps in 1886.

== Organization and Ranks ==
Strength of the Hospital Corps 1888–1902
| In service, June 30 | Hospital Stewards | Acting Hospital Stewards | Privates | Source |
| 1888 | 155 | 36 | 681 | |
| 1889 | 141 | 50 | 588 | |
| 1891 | 124 | 71 | 530 | |
| 1893 | 122 | 72 | 585 | |
| 1894 | 117 | 75 | 585 | |
| 1899 | 189 | 287 | 2,892 | |
| 1900 | 167 | 381 | 3,548 | |
| 1901 | 246 | 388 | 3,702 | |
| 1902 | 271 | 405 | 3,366 | |

The Hospital Corps was created in 1886 was to be composed of Hospital Stewards, Acting Hospital Stewards and Privates, the number of which were to be decided by the Secretary of War. Enlisted men not belonging to the Corps would not be detailed to medical service. The members of the Corps would perform all enlisted medical services in hospital and in the field. In 1896 the Congress fixed the number of hospital stewards to 100. The Corps then had about 100 acting hospital stewards and about 500 privates. In 1901, the rank of Lance Acting Hospital Steward was given to prospective hospital stewards during a probationary period, and in 1903 the rank of Corporal was introduced; specifically created for those men who were good leaders but unable to pass the required examinations for promotion. In 1903, the ranks of the hospital stewards were put in line with the rest of the army; Hospital Stewards becoming Sergeants First Class, Acting Hospital Stewards becoming Sergeants, Lance Acting Hospital Steward becoming Lance Corporals. By 1909, the rank of Private First Class had been introduced, in the proportion not exceeding one to two privates. The Corps then had 300 sergeants first class, 300 sergeants and 20 corporals. The largest strength of the Corps occurred during the Spanish–American War; in June 1898 it contained 133 hospital stewards, 172 acting hospital stewards and 2,940 privates. The peak was reached in November the same year with about 6,000 men serving in the Corps, although about 22,500 were needed.

== Recruitment and Promotion ==
Strength of the Hospital Corps 1903–1915
| In service, June 30 | Sergeants First Class | Sergeants | Corporals | Privates First Class | Privates | Source |
| 1903 | 279 | 313 | 10 | 1,668 | 762 | |
| 1904 | 274 | 269 | 19 | 1,490 | 1,028 | |
| 1905 | 275 | 277 | 16 | 1,159 | 1,333 | |
| 1906 | 290 | 267 | 18 | 1,467 | 1,154 | |
| 1907 | 266 | 289 | 20 | 1,468 | 1,276 | |
| 1908 | 277 | 297 | 17 | 1,480 | 1,460 | |
| 1909 | 299 | 290 | 18 | 1,358 | 1,345 | |
| 1910 | 274 | 339 | 44 | 1,295 | 1,266 | |
| 1911 | 285 | 333 | 40 | 1,270 | 1,330 | |
| 1912 | 262 | 341 | 39 | 2,654 | | |
| 1913 | 295 | 336 | 38 | 2,560 | | |
| 1914 | 300 | 399 | 41 | 3,135 | | |
| 1915 | 299 | 408 | 42 | 3,057 | | |

The Hospital Corps was recruited from enlisted men who had served one year in the line. The accepted candidate then received instruction at a detachment of the Corps, before being transferred to a post where he would be assigned duties as nurse, cook or attendant. Privates having served twelve months in the Corps, or graduates in pharmacy having served six months, could be recommended for promotion. Thus recommended were promoted to Acting Hospital Stewards after having passed an examination. Promotion to full Hospital Steward was possible after one year's service in an acting capacity, and after having passed a second and more rigorous examination.

In 1909, privates and privates first class recommended for promotion could be detailed as lance corporals to test their ability to perform the duties of a non-commissioned officer. An examination was required in order to be promoted to Sergeant. Sergeants with one year time-in-grade, as well as other members of the Corps having served at least six months as Hospital Stewards of Volunteers during and since the Spanish–American War, could be promoted to Sergeants First Class after having passed a detailed and extensive examination.

Although the desertion rate of the Hospital Corps was only 2% annually, compared to the rest of the Army's 10%, the Medical Department found it difficult to recruit and retain a sufficient number of men in the Corps. Two years after its formation, the Corps still had 135 of 739 slots unfilled. It was especially difficult to find competent cooks. Experienced members also transferred to the line, where pay and promotion was better. A pay increase in 1892 led to better quality among the candidates for promotion to Hospital Steward. However, those passing the examination were the most intelligent men, rather than the best leaders.

== Training ==
Monthly pay of Enlisted Men 1898
| Rank | First year of enlistment | Fifth year of enlistment | Sixth and subsequent years of enlistment |
| Hospital Stewards | $45 | $48 | $50 |
| Acting Hospital Stewards | $25 | $28 | $30 |
| Privates, Hospital Corps | $18 | $21 | $23 |
| First Sergeants, Infantry | $34 | $37 | $39 |
| Sergeants, Infantry | $18 | $21 | $23 |
| Privates, Infantry | $13 | $16 | $18 |

In spite of the objective behind the creation of the Hospital Corps, its members were mainly trained for peacetime tasks. Instructions were given in cooking, horseback riding, horse care, first aid, anatomy, physiology, nursing and pharmacy. In 1909, the training contained a basic course of discipline and the duties of a soldier, drill and field work, animal care and horseback riding, anatomy and physiology, first aid and personal and camp hygiene, and nursing for all candidates, and a complete course for those with special aptitude, which added army regulations, cooking, Materia medica and pharmacy, elementary hygiene, and clerical work to the basic course. Examination for promotion to Acting Hospital Steward tested the candidates knowledge in the principles of arithmetic, in orthography and penmanship, regulations affecting enlisted men, care of sick, ward management, minor surgery, hospital corps drill and first aid, ordinary modes of cooking and elementary hygiene, as well as evaluating the candidates physical fitness, moral character and general aptitude. The later examination for promotion to Sergeant had the same content.

== Disbandment ==
The National Defense Act of 1916 disbanded the Hospital Corps, its members becoming members in the corresponding grades of the enlisted force of the Army Medical Department.

== Gallery ==
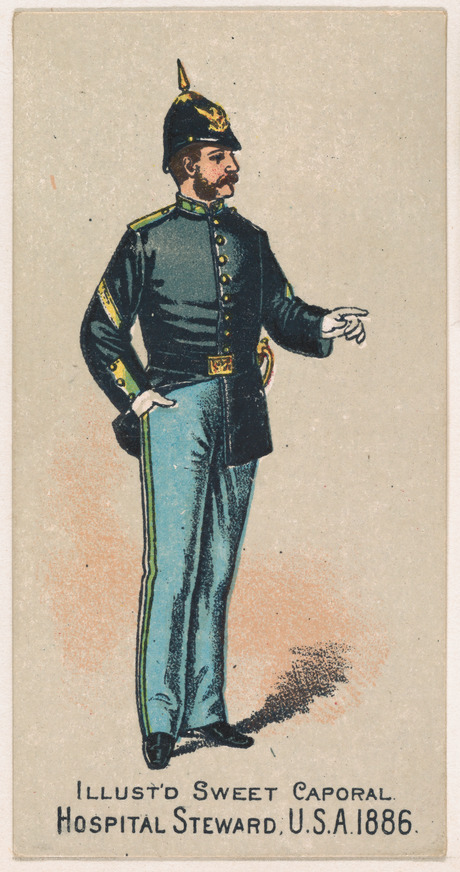
Hospital Steward, 1886.

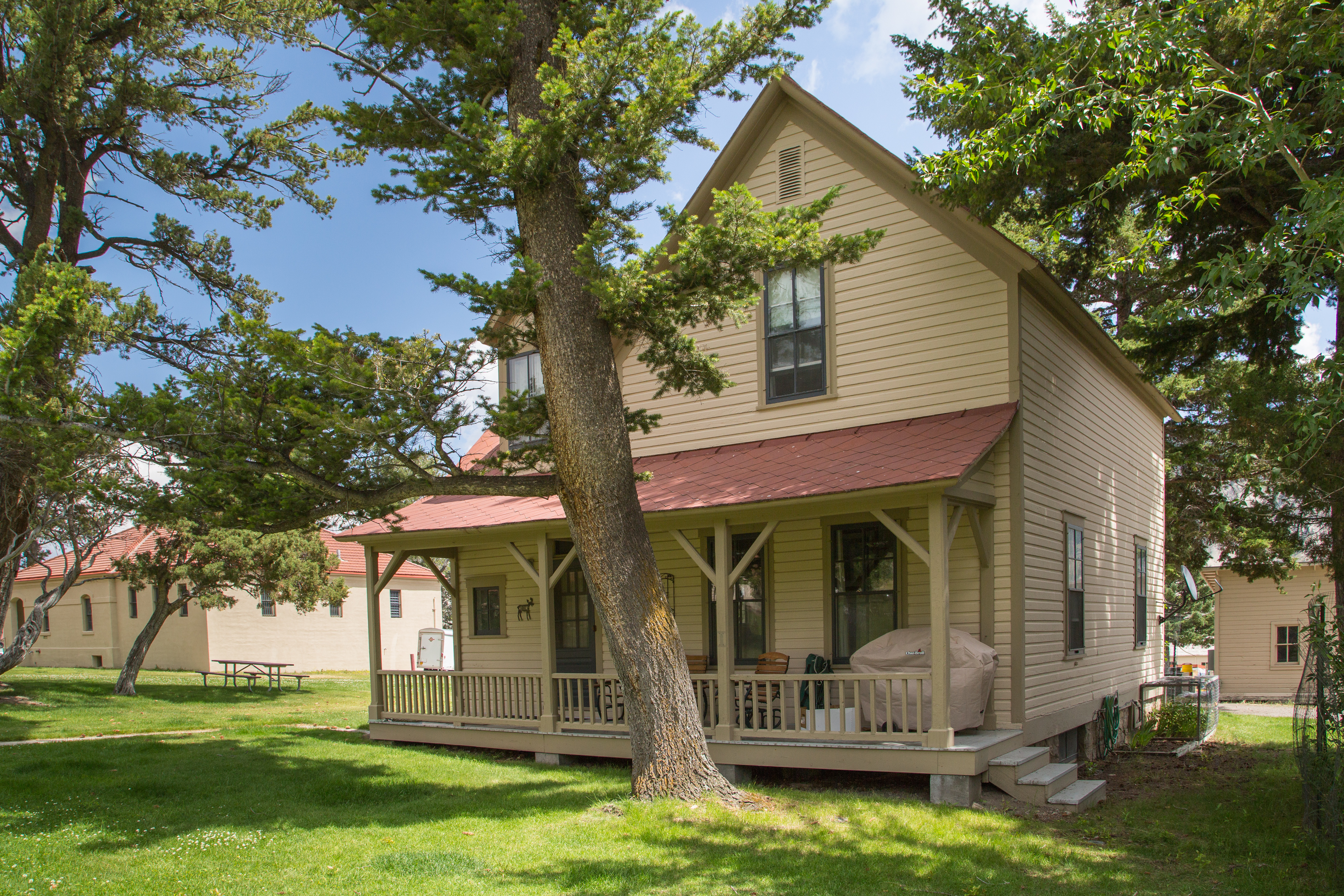
Hospital Steward's quarters, Fort Yellowstone.

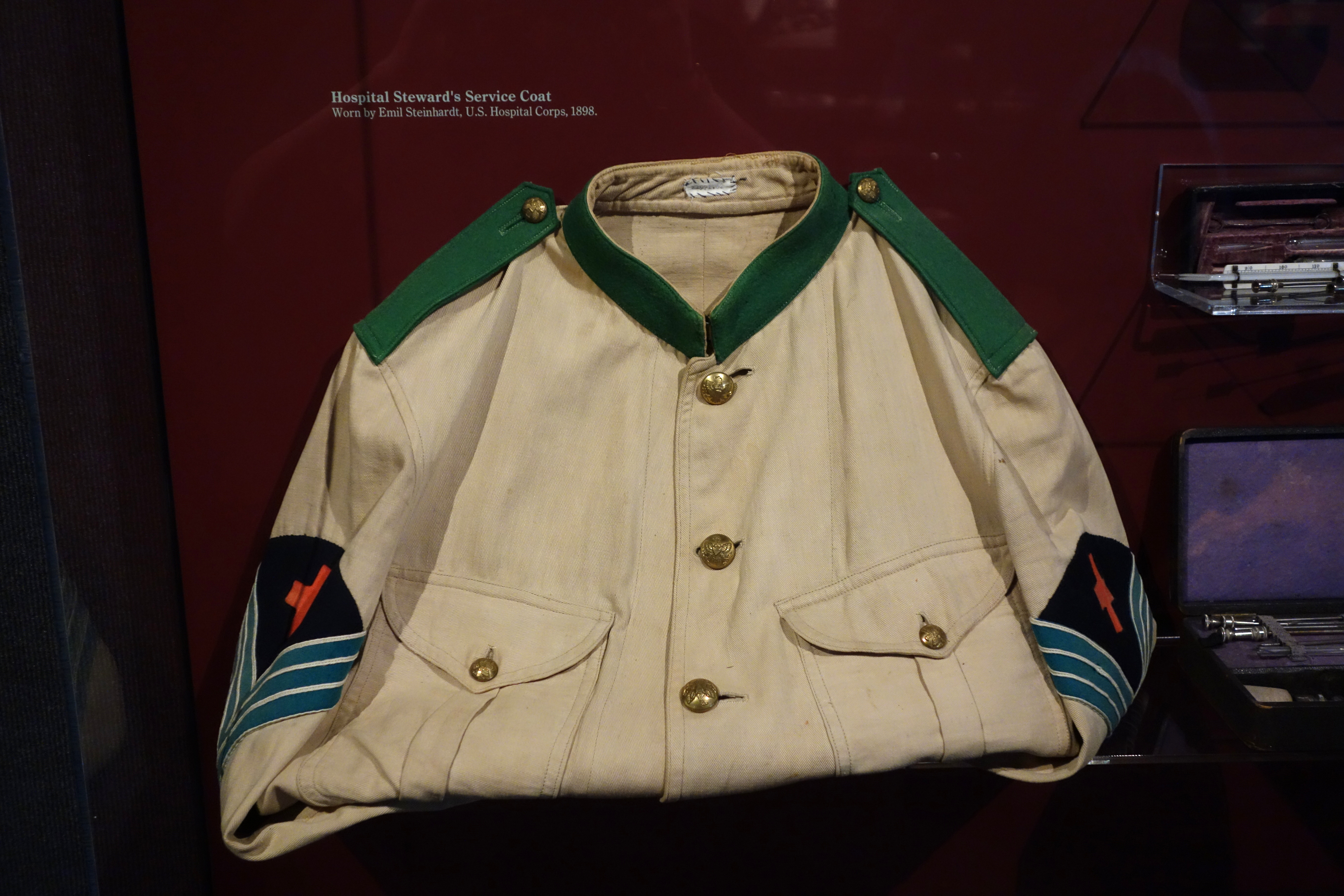
Hospital Steward's service coat, 1898.

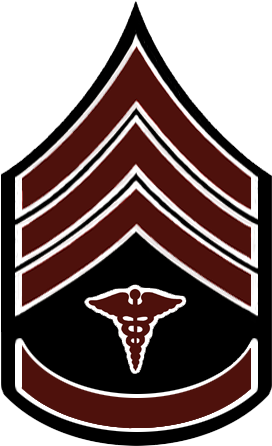
Rank insignia for Sergeant First Class, 1902–1909.

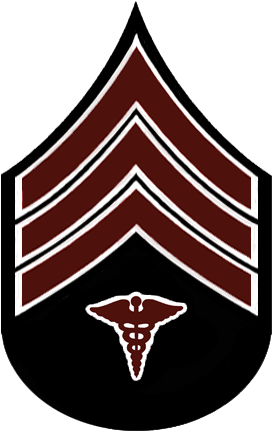
Rank insignia for Sergeant, 1902–1909.

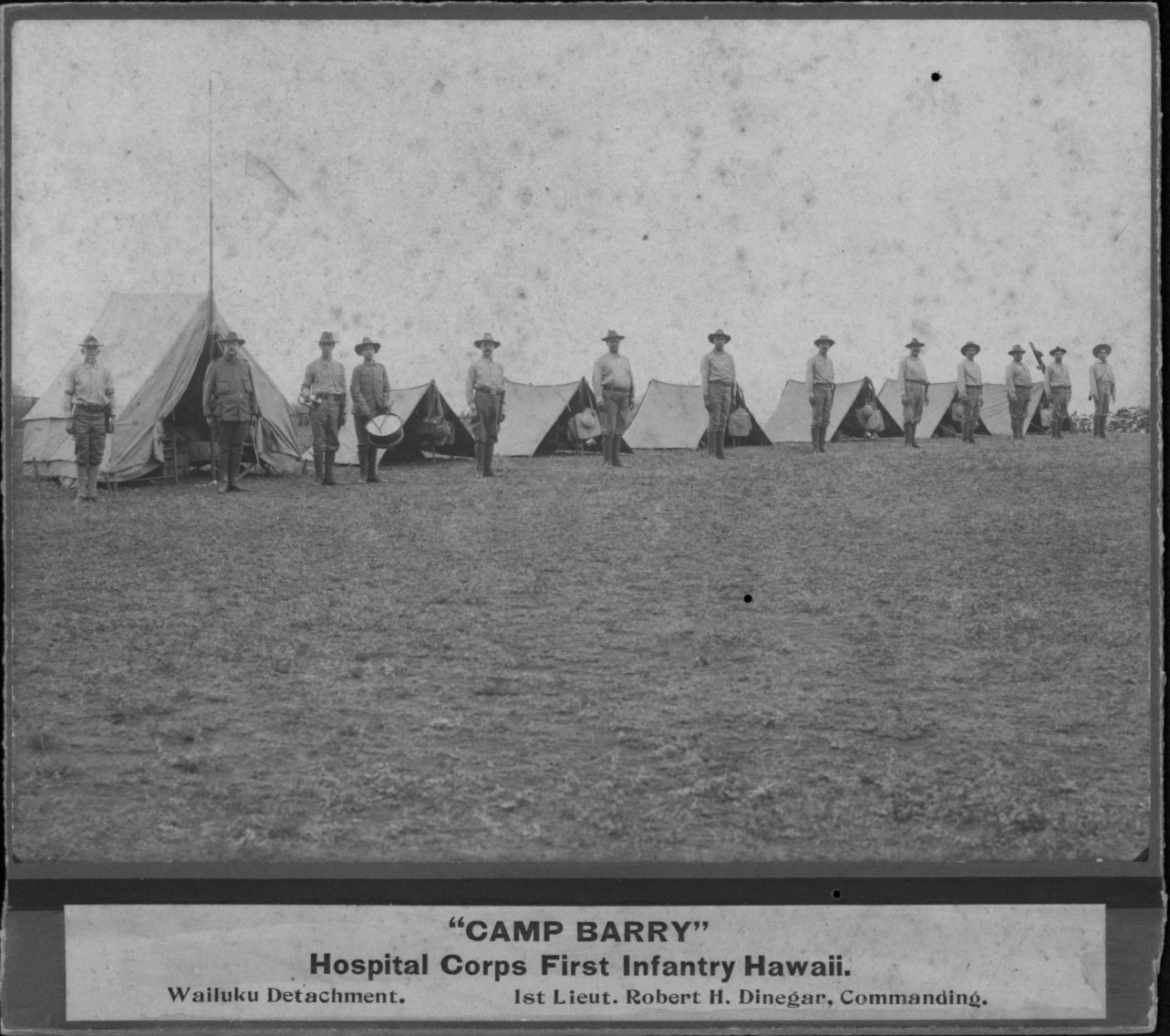
Hospital Corpsmen in Hawaii, 1908.
