= Wolfram Conrad Fuchs =

German-born electrical engineer

Wolfram Conrad Fuchs (1865–1908) was a German-born electrical engineer who became a pioneer in radiography. He opened the first x-ray laboratory in the United States in Chicago, and had completed over 1400 x-ray examinations by 1896. His work was critical to the history of radiation protection. He was the father of Arthur Wolfram Fuchs (1895 - 1962), the inventor of the fixed kilovoltage technique of radiography.

== Early life and education ==
Fuchs was born in Germany in 1865 to Julius and Wilhelmina Fuchs. The family emigrated to Chicago in 1870. He returned to Germany to study electrical engineering at the University of Berlin and graduated in 1889. He then went on to Paris to study at the Ecole des Beaux Arts. Upon returning to the United States, Fuchs completed his post-graduate work at the Massachusetts Institute of Technology in Boston.

== Radiography work ==
Shortly after Wilhelm Röntgen's discovery of x-rays, Fuchs was traveling in Germany and was interested in the potential implications x-rays could have for electrical engineering. Meanwhile, in Chicago, Dr. Friedrich Cort Hamisch was also becoming interested in x-ray technology and had established a correspondence with Röntgen. He set up an x-ray laboratory but eventually handed it over to Dr. Otto L. Schmidt, who placed Fuchs in charge of what was eventually known as the Fuchs X-ray Laboratory.

Fuchs' son, Arthur Wolfram Fuchs, wrote in his personal correspondence that:

"[the laboratory" was a Mecca for physicians and manufacturers who wanted information regarding the machinery to use and the technic of radiography. He was, according to the men of his time, one of the outstanding radiographers. it seemed that, for a time, no one could obtain the pictures which he was able to make routinely. He was so wrapped up in his experimental work that he would often sleep in his laboratory night after night and week-ends."

Fuchs was called to Buffalo, NY to aid the dying President William McKinley after his assassination in 1901, even though no x-rays were ever ultimately used.

== Early radiation protection ==
Fuchs realized the radiation damage from x-ray technology before it was acknowledged by the American Medical Association. His own extensive experimentation with x-rays resulted in severe Roentgen-Dermatitis, requiring the eventual amputation of his fingers and thumbs on both hands. Fuchs believed that "the damage must be seen to be insignificant compared to the good that follows from this wonderful discovery," and came up with ideas to reduce the damage. On December 12, 1896, Fuchs made the following reasonable recommendations in Western Electrician:

- Make the exposure as short as possible
- Do not place the x-ray tube closer to the body than 12 inches (30 cm).
- Rub the skin carefully with Vaseline and leave a layer on the part that shall be exposed.

He also added that: "The x-ray 'burn' is no more dangerous than normal burns... when the x rays encounter the skull for a longer period, the hair falls out but it grows back without any unpleasant after-effects."

== Death ==
Also suffering from metastatic cancer, Fuchs died after several operations on April 21, 1907.
