= Armenian Martyrs' Congregational Church =

Coordinates: 39.964079°N 75.310989°W

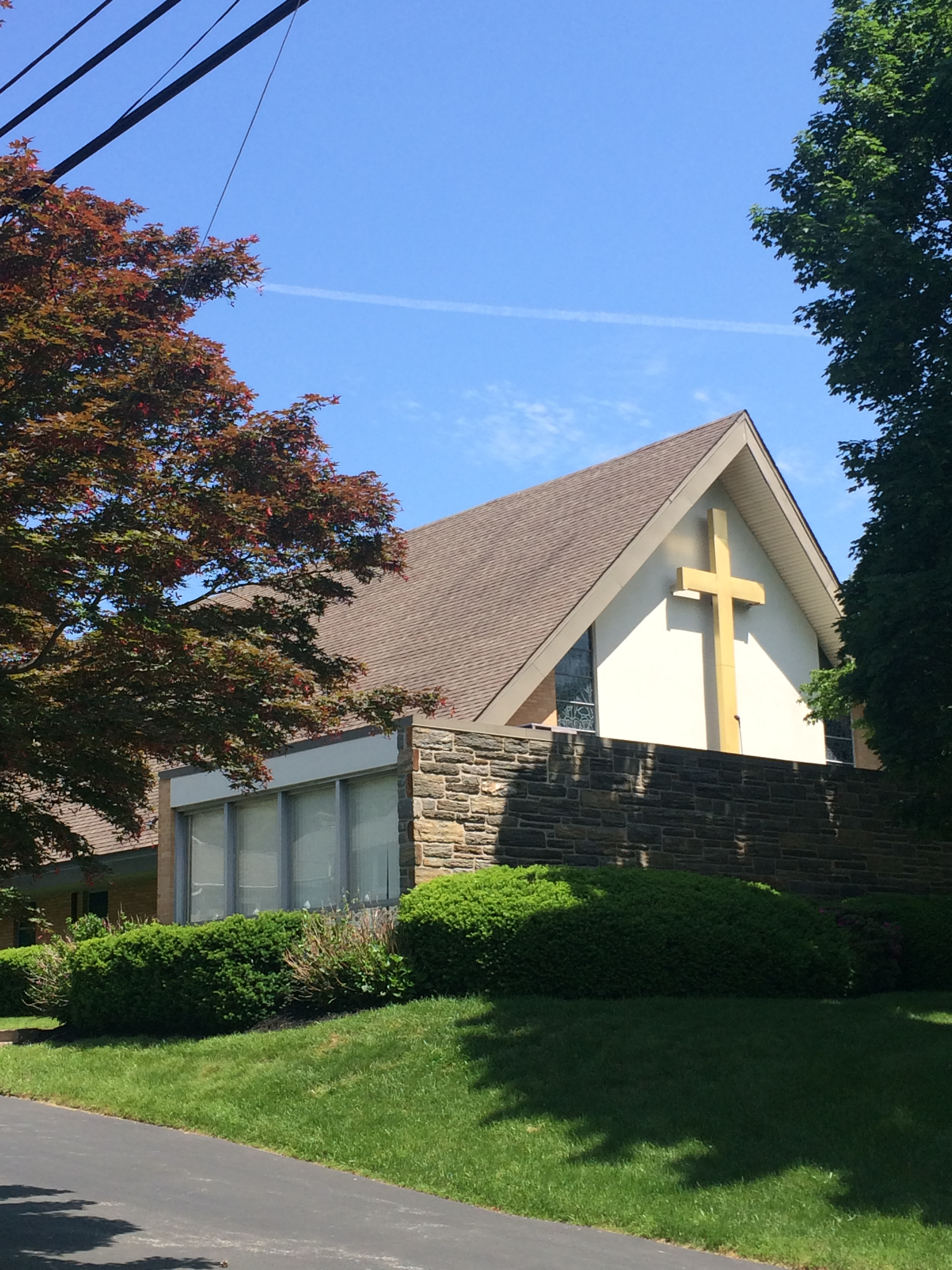

Religion
- Affiliation: Armenian Evangelical Church
- Deity: Christian God
- Status: Open

Location
- Location: Havertown, Pennsylvania
- Country: United States
- Interactive map of Armenian Martyrs' Congregational Church

Architecture
- Completed: 1907

The Armenian Martyrs' Congregational Church is in Havertown, Pennsylvania, founded in 1907, is a member of the Armenian Evangelical Union of North America.
