= Isotopes of plutonium =

Isotopes of plutonium (_{94}Pu)
Main isotopes			Decay	
Isotope	abundance	half-life (t_{1/2})	mode	product
^{236}Pu	synth	2.858 y	α	^{232}U
^{236}Pu	synth	2.858 y	SF	–
^{238}Pu	trace	87.7 y	α	^{234}U
^{238}Pu	trace	87.7 y	SF	–
^{239}Pu	trace	2.411×10^{4} y	α	^{235}U
^{239}Pu	trace	2.411×10^{4} y	SF	–
^{240}Pu	trace	6.561×10^{3} y	α	^{236}U
^{240}Pu	trace	6.561×10^{3} y	SF	–
^{241}Pu	synth	14.33 y	β^{−}	^{241}Am
^{241}Pu	synth	14.33 y	α	^{237}U
^{241}Pu	synth	14.33 y	SF	–
^{242}Pu	synth	3.75×10^{5} y	α	^{238}U
^{242}Pu	synth	3.75×10^{5} y	SF	–
^{244}Pu	trace	8.13×10^{7} y	α	^{240}U
^{244}Pu	trace	8.13×10^{7} y	SF	–

Plutonium (_{94}Pu) is an artificial element, except for trace quantities resulting from neutron capture by uranium, and thus a standard atomic weight cannot be given. (Note: Primordial plutonium-244 is predicted to occur in trace quantities in rare-earth minerals. However, as of 2021, measurements of various bastnäsite samples have placed an upper limit of its concentration on the order of 10^{−19} by mass.) Like all artificial elements, it has no stable isotopes. It was synthesized before being found in nature, with the first isotope synthesized being ^{238}Pu in 1940. Twenty-two plutonium radioisotopes have been characterized. The most stable are ^{244}Pu with a half-life of 81.3 million years, ^{242}Pu with a half-life of 375,000 years, ^{239}Pu with a half-life of 24,110 years, and ^{240}Pu with a half-life of 6,561 years. This element also has eight meta states; all have half-lives of less than one second.

The known isotopes of plutonium range from ^{226}Pu to ^{247}Pu. The primary decay modes before the most stable isotope, ^{244}Pu, are spontaneous fission and alpha decay; the primary mode after is beta emission. The primary decay products before ^{244}Pu are isotopes of uranium and neptunium (not considering fission products), and the primary decay products after are isotopes of americium.

== List of isotopes ==
Nuclide (Note: ^{m}Pu – Excited nuclear isomer.)	Z	N	Isotopic mass (Da) (Note: ( ) – Uncertainty (1σ) is given in concise form in parentheses after the corresponding last digits.) (Note: # – Atomic mass marked #: value and uncertainty derived not from purely experimental data, but at least partly from trends from the Mass Surface (TMS).)	Discovery year	Half-life	Decay mode (Note: Modes of decay: EC: / Electron capture; CD: / Cluster decay; IT: / Isomeric transition; SF: / Spontaneous fission)	Daughter isotope (Note: Bold italics symbol as daughter – Daughter product is nearly stable.) (Note: Bold symbol as daughter – Daughter product is stable.)	Spin and parity (Note: ( ) spin value – Indicates spin with weak assignment arguments.) (Note: # – Values marked # are not purely derived from experimental data, but at least partly from trends of neighboring nuclides (TNN).)	Isotopic abundance
Nuclide	Excitation energy			Discovery year	Half-life	Decay mode	Daughter isotope	Spin and parity	Isotopic abundance
^{226}Pu	94	132	226.03825(22)#	(2024)	≥1 ms	α	^{222}U	0+	
^{227}Pu	94	133	227.03947(11)#	2024	0.78+0.39 −0.19 s	α	^{223}U	5/2+#	
^{228}Pu	94	134	228.038763(25)	1994	2.1(13) s	α	^{224}U	0+	
^{229}Pu	94	135	229.040145(65)	1994	91(26) s	α (~50%)	^{225}U	3/2+#	
^{229}Pu	94	135	229.040145(65)	1994	91(26) s	β^{+} (~50%)	^{229}Np	3/2+#	
^{229}Pu	94	135	229.040145(65)	1994	91(26) s	SF (<7%)	(various)	3/2+#	
^{230}Pu	94	136	230.039648(16)	1990	105(10) s	α (>73%)	^{226}U	0+	
^{230}Pu	94	136	230.039648(16)	1990	105(10) s	β^{+} (<27%)	^{230}Np	0+	
^{231}Pu	94	137	231.041126(24)	1999	8.6(5) min	β^{+} (87%)	^{231}Np	(3/2+)	
^{231}Pu	94	137	231.041126(24)	1999	8.6(5) min	α (13%)	^{227}U	(3/2+)	
^{232}Pu	94	138	232.041182(18)	1973	33.7(5) min	EC (77%)	^{232}Np	0+	
^{232}Pu	94	138	232.041182(18)	1973	33.7(5) min	α (23%)	^{228}U	0+	
^{233}Pu	94	139	233.042997(58)	1957	20.9(4) min	β^{+} (99.88%)	^{233}Np	5/2+#	
^{233}Pu	94	139	233.042997(58)	1957	20.9(4) min	α (0.12%)	^{229}U	5/2+#	
^{234}Pu	94	140	234.0433175(73)	1949	8.8(1) h	EC (94%)	^{234}Np	0+	
^{234}Pu	94	140	234.0433175(73)	1949	8.8(1) h	α (6%)	^{230}U	0+	
^{235}Pu	94	141	235.045285(22)	1957	25.3(5) min	β^{+}	^{235}Np	(5/2+)	
^{235}Pu	94	141	235.045285(22)	1957	25.3(5) min	α (0.0028%)	^{231}U	(5/2+)	
^{236}Pu	94	142	236.0460567(19)	1949	2.858(8) y	α (Note: Theorized to also undergo β^{+}β^{+} decay to ^{236}U)	^{232}U	0+	
^{236}Pu	94	142	236.0460567(19)	1949	2.858(8) y	SF (1.9 × 10^{−7}%)	(various)	0+	
^{236}Pu	94	142	236.0460567(19)	1949	2.858(8) y	CD (2 × 10^{−12}%)	^{208}Pb + ^{28}Mg	0+	
^{236m}Pu	1185.45(15) keV			2005	1.2(3) μs	IT	^{236}Pu	5−	
^{237}Pu	94	143	237.0484079(18)	1949	45.64(4) d	EC	^{237}Np	7/2−	
^{237}Pu	94	143	237.0484079(18)	1949	45.64(4) d	α (0.0042%)	^{233}U	7/2−	
^{237m1}Pu	145.543(8) keV			1957	180(20) ms	IT	^{237}Pu	1/2+	
^{237m2}Pu	2600(20) keV			1969	103(7) ns	SF	(various)		
^{237m3}Pu	2900(250) keV			1970	1.1(1) μs	SF	(various)		
^{238}Pu	94	144	238.0495582(12)	1949	87.7(1) y	α	^{234}U	0+	Trace (Note: Double beta decay product of ^{238}U)
^{238}Pu	94	144	238.0495582(12)	1949	87.7(1) y	SF (1.9 × 10^{−7}%)	(various)	0+	Trace
^{238}Pu	94	144	238.0495582(12)	1949	87.7(1) y	CD (1.4 × 10^{−14}%)	^{206}Hg + ^{32}Si	0+	Trace
^{238}Pu	94	144	238.0495582(12)	1949	87.7(1) y	CD (6 × 10^{−15}%)	^{210}Pb + ^{28}Mg^{208}Pb + ^{30}Mg	0+	Trace
^{239}Pu (Note: fissile nuclide) (Note: Most useful isotope for nuclear weapons)	94	145	239.0521616(12)	1946	2.411(3)×10^{4} y	α	^{235}U	1/2+	Trace (Note: Neutron capture product of ^{238}U)
^{239}Pu	94	145	239.0521616(12)	1946	2.411(3)×10^{4} y	SF (3.1 × 10^{−10}%)	(various)	1/2+	Trace
^{239m1}Pu	391.584(3) keV			1955	193(4) ns	IT	^{239}Pu	7/2−	
^{239m2}Pu	3100(200) keV			1970	7.5(10) μs	SF	(various)	(5/2+)	
^{240}Pu	94	146	240.0538117(12)	1949	6.561(7)×10^{3} y	α	^{236}U	0+	Trace (Note: Intermediate decay product of ^{244}Pu)
^{240}Pu	94	146	240.0538117(12)	1949	6.561(7)×10^{3} y	SF (5.796 × 10^{−6}%)	(various)	0+	Trace
^{240}Pu	94	146	240.0538117(12)	1949	6.561(7)×10^{3} y	CD (<1.3 × 10^{−11}%)	^{206}Hg + ^{34}Si	0+	Trace
^{240m}Pu	1308.74(5) keV			1967	165(10) ns	IT	^{240}Pu	5−	
^{241}Pu	94	147	241.0568497(12)	1949	14.329(29) y (Note: Can undergo Bound-state β^{−} decay with a half-life of 4.2 days when fully ionized)	β^{−}	^{241}Am	5/2+	
^{241}Pu	94	147	241.0568497(12)	1949	14.329(29) y	α (0.00245%)	^{237}U	5/2+	
^{241}Pu	94	147	241.0568497(12)	1949	14.329(29) y	SF (<2.4 × 10^{−14}%)	(various)	5/2+	
^{241m1}Pu	161.6853(9) keV			1975	0.88(5) μs	IT	^{241}Pu	1/2+	
^{241m2}Pu	2200(200) keV			1970	20.5(22) μs	SF	(various)		
^{242}Pu	94	148	242.0587410(13)	1950	3.75(2)×10^{5} y	α	^{238}U	0+	
^{242}Pu	94	148	242.0587410(13)	1950	3.75(2)×10^{5} y	SF (5.510 × 10^{−4}%)	(various)	0+	
^{243}Pu	94	149	243.0620021(27)	1951	4.9553(25) h	β^{−}	^{243}Am	7/2+	
^{243m}Pu	383.64(25) keV			1975	330(30) ns	IT	^{243}Pu	(1/2+)	
^{244}Pu	94	150	244.0642044(25)	1954	8.13(3)×10^{7} y	α (99.88%)	^{240}U	0+	Trace (Note: Interstellar, some may also be primordial but such claims are disputed)
^{244}Pu	94	150	244.0642044(25)	1954	8.13(3)×10^{7} y	SF (0.123%)	(various)	0+	Trace
^{244}Pu	94	150	244.0642044(25)	1954	8.13(3)×10^{7} y	β^{−}β^{−} (<7.3 × 10^{−9}%)	^{244}Cm	0+	Trace
^{244m}Pu	1216.0(5) keV			2016	1.75(12) s	IT	^{244}Pu	8−	
^{245}Pu	94	151	245.067825(15)	1955	10.5(1) h	β^{−}	^{245}Am	(9/2−)	
^{245m1}Pu	264.5(3) keV			2007	330(20) ns	IT	^{245}Pu	(5/2+)	
^{245m2}Pu	2000(400) keV			(1980) (Note: No evidence of this isomeric state in the refereed literature)	90(30) ns	SF	(various)		
^{246}Pu	94	152	246.070204(16)	1955	10.84(2) d	β^{−}	^{246}Am	0+	
^{247}Pu	94	153	247.07430(22)#	1983	2.27(23) d	β^{−}	^{247}Am	1/2+#	
This table header & footer:

== Actinides vs fission products ==
Actinides and fission products by half-life
Actinides by decay chain				Half-life range (a)	Fission products of ^{235}U by yield
4n (Thorium)	4n + 1 (Neptunium)	4n + 2 (Radium)	4n + 3 (Actinium)	Half-life range (a)	4.5–7%	0.04–1.25%	<0.001%
^{228}Ra^{№}				4–6 a		^{155}Eu^{þ}
^{248}Bk				> 9 a
^{244}Cm^{ƒ}	^{241}Pu^{ƒ}	^{250}Cf	^{227}Ac^{№}	10–29 a	^{90}Sr	^{85}Kr	^{113m}Cd^{þ}
^{232}U^{ƒ}		^{238}Pu^{ƒ}	^{243}Cm^{ƒ}	29–97 a	^{137}Cs	^{151}Sm^{þ}	^{121m}Sn
	^{249}Cf^{ƒ}	^{242m}Am^{ƒ}		141–351 a	No fission products have a half-life in the range of 100 a–210 ka ...
	^{241}Am^{ƒ}		^{251}Cf^{ƒ}	430–900 a	No fission products have a half-life in the range of 100 a–210 ka ...
		^{226}Ra^{№}	^{247}Bk	1.3–1.6 ka	No fission products have a half-life in the range of 100 a–210 ka ...
^{240}Pu	^{229}Th	^{246}Cm^{ƒ}	^{243}Am^{ƒ}	4.7–7.4 ka	No fission products have a half-life in the range of 100 a–210 ka ...
	^{245}Cm^{ƒ}	^{250}Cm		8.3–8.5 ka	No fission products have a half-life in the range of 100 a–210 ka ...
			^{239}Pu^{ƒ}	24.1 ka	No fission products have a half-life in the range of 100 a–210 ka ...
		^{230}Th^{№}	^{231}Pa^{№}	32–76 ka	No fission products have a half-life in the range of 100 a–210 ka ...
^{236}Np^{ƒ}	^{233}U^{ƒ}	^{234}U^{№}		150–250 ka	^{99}Tc^{₡}	^{126}Sn
^{248}Cm		^{242}Pu		327–375 ka		^{79}Se^{₡}
				1.33 Ma	^{135}Cs^{₡}
	^{237}Np^{ƒ}			1.61–6.5 Ma	^{93}Zr	^{107}Pd
^{236}U			^{247}Cm^{ƒ}	15–24 Ma		^{129}I^{₡}
^{244}Pu				80 Ma	... nor beyond 15.7 Ma
^{232}Th^{№}		^{238}U^{№}	^{235}U^{ƒ№}	0.7–14.1 Ga	... nor beyond 15.7 Ma
₡, has thermal neutron capture cross section in the range of 8–50 barns; ƒ, fissile; №, primarily a naturally occurring radioactive material (NORM); þ, neutron poison (thermal neutron capture cross section greater than 3k barns)

== Notable isotopes ==
- Plutonium-238 has a half-life of 87.74 years and emits alpha particles. Pure ^{238}Pu for radioisotope thermoelectric generators that power some spacecraft is produced by neutron capture on neptunium-237 but plutonium from spent nuclear fuel can contain as much as a few percent ^{238}Pu, originating from ^{237}Np, alpha decay of ^{242}Cm, or (n,2n) reactions.
- Plutonium-239 has half-life 24,100 years. ^{239}Pu and ^{241}Pu are fissile; meaning their nuclei can split by being bombarded by slow thermal neutrons, releasing energy, gamma radiation and more neutrons. It can therefore sustain a nuclear chain reaction, leading to applications in nuclear weapons and nuclear reactors. ^{239}Pu is synthesized by irradiating uranium-238 with neutrons in a nuclear reactor, then recovered via nuclear reprocessing of the fuel. Further neutron capture produces successively heavier isotopes.
- Plutonium-240 has a high rate of spontaneous fission, raising the background neutron radiation of plutonium. Plutonium is graded by proportion of ^{240}Pu: weapons grade (<7%), fuel grade (7–19%) and reactor grade (>19%). Lower grades are less suited for bombs and thermal reactors but can fuel fast reactors.
- Plutonium-241 is fissile, but beta decays with a half-life of 14 years to americium-241.
- Plutonium-242 is not fissile, nor very fertile (requiring 3 more neutron captures to become fissile); and has a low neutron capture cross section, and a longer half-life than any of the lighter isotopes.
- Plutonium-244 is the most stable isotope of plutonium, with a half-life of about 80 million years. It is not significantly produced in nuclear reactors because ^{243}Pu has a short half-life, but some is produced in nuclear explosions. ^{244}Pu has been found in interstellar space and has the second longest half-life of any non-primordial radioisotope.

== Production and uses ==
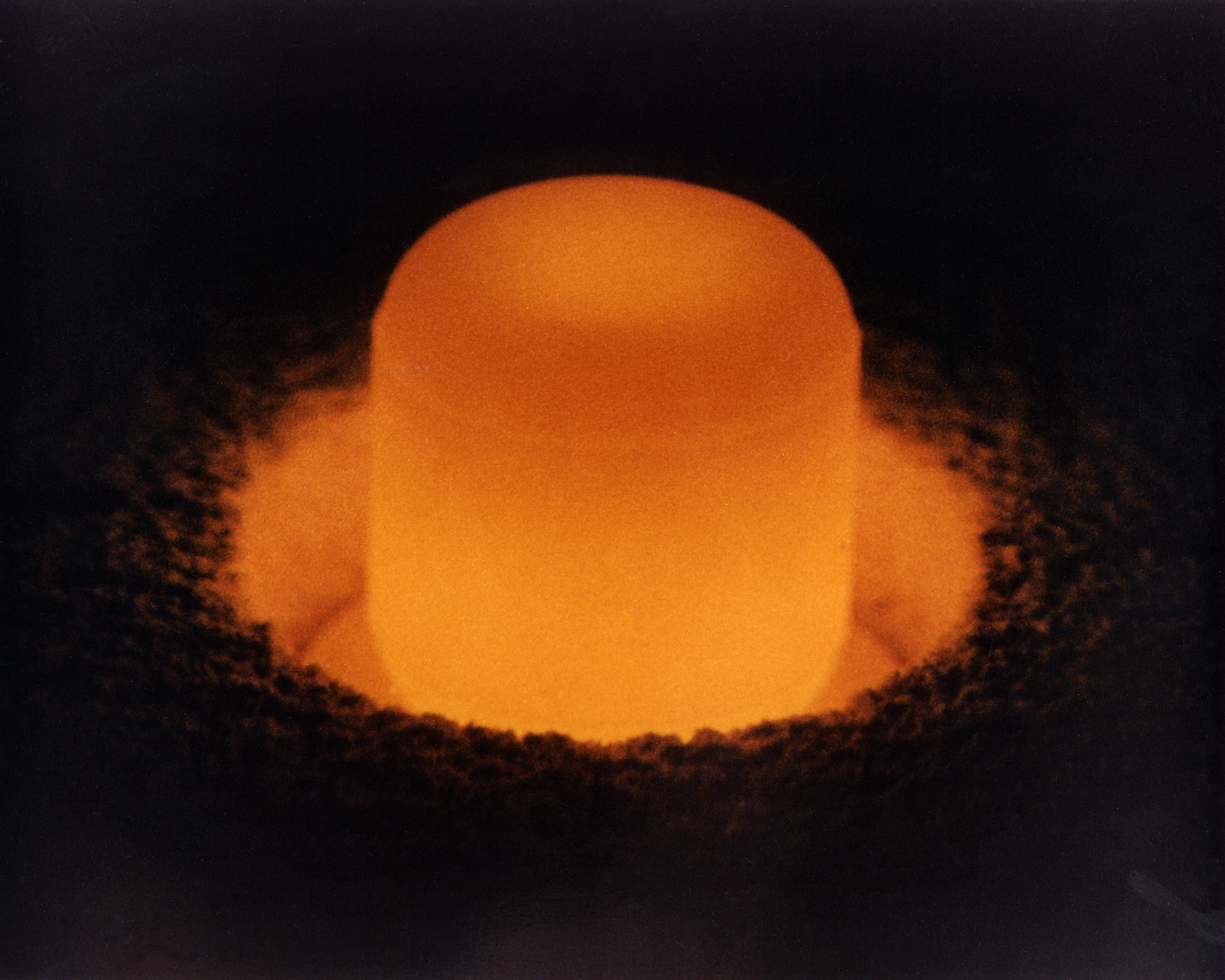
A pellet of ^{238}Pu, glowing from its own heat, used for radioisotope thermoelectric generators.

Transmutation flow between ^{238}Pu and ^{244}Cm in LWR. Transmutation speed not shown and varies greatly by nuclide. ^{245}Cm–^{248}Cm are long-lived with negligible decay.

^{239}Pu, a fissile isotope that is the second most used nuclear fuel in nuclear reactors after uranium-235, and the most used fuel in the fission portion of nuclear weapons, is produced from uranium-238 by neutron capture followed by two beta decays.

^{240}Pu, ^{241}Pu, and ^{242}Pu are produced by further neutron capture. The odd-mass isotopes ^{239}Pu and ^{241}Pu have about a 3/4 chance of undergoing fission on capture of a thermal neutron and about a 1/4 chance of retaining the neutron and becoming the next heavier isotope. The even-mass isotopes are fertile but not fissile and also have a lower probability (cross section) of neutron capture; therefore, they tend to accumulate in nuclear fuel used in a thermal reactor, the design of nearly all nuclear power plants today. In plutonium that has been used a second time in thermal reactors in MOX fuel, ^{240}Pu may even be the most common isotope. All plutonium isotopes and other actinides, however, are fissionable with fast neutrons. ^{240}Pu does have a moderate thermal neutron absorption cross section, so that ^{241}Pu production in a thermal reactor becomes a significant fraction as large as ^{239}Pu production.

^{241}Pu has a half-life of 14 years, and has slightly higher thermal neutron cross sections than ^{239}Pu for both fission and absorption. While nuclear fuel is being used in a reactor, a ^{241}Pu nucleus is much more likely to fission or to capture a neutron than to decay. ^{241}Pu accounts for a significant portion of fissions in thermal reactor fuel that has been used for some time. However, in spent nuclear fuel that does not quickly undergo nuclear reprocessing but instead is cooled for years after use, much or most of the ^{241}Pu will beta decay to americium-241, one of the minor actinides, a strong alpha emitter, and difficult to use in thermal reactors.

^{242}Pu has a particularly low cross section for thermal neutron capture; and it takes three neutron absorptions to become another fissile isotope (either curium-245 or ^{241}Pu) and fission. Even then, there is a chance either of those two fissile isotopes will fail to fission but instead absorb a fourth neutron, becoming curium-246 (on the way to even heavier actinides like californium, which is a neutron emitter by spontaneous fission and difficult to handle) or becoming ^{242}Pu again; so the mean number of neutrons absorbed before fission is even higher than 3. Therefore, ^{242}Pu is particularly unsuited to recycling in a thermal reactor and would be better used in a fast reactor where it can be fissioned directly. However, ^{242}Pu's low cross section means that relatively little of it will be transmuted during one cycle in a thermal reactor. ^{242}Pu's half-life is about 15 times as long as ^{239}Pu's half-life; therefore, it is 1/15 as radioactive and not one of the larger contributors to nuclear waste radioactivity. ^{242}Pu's gamma ray emissions are also weaker than those of the other isotopes.

^{243}Pu has a half-life of only 5 hours, beta decaying to americium-243. Because ^{243}Pu has little opportunity to capture an additional neutron before decay, the nuclear fuel cycle does not produce the long-lived ^{244}Pu in significant quantity.

^{238}Pu is not normally produced in as large quantity by the nuclear fuel cycle, but some is produced from neptunium-237 by neutron capture (this reaction can also be used with purified neptunium to produce ^{238}Pu relatively free of other plutonium isotopes for use in radioisotope thermoelectric generators), by the (n,2n) reaction of fast neutrons on ^{239}Pu, or by alpha decay of curium-242, which is produced by neutron capture of ^{241}Am. It has significant thermal neutron cross section for fission, but is more likely to capture a neutron and become ^{239}Pu.

== Manufacture ==
=== Plutonium-240, -241 and -242 ===
The fission cross section for ^{239}Pu is 747.9 barns for thermal neutrons, while the activation cross section is 270.7 barns (the ratio approximates to 11 fissions for every 4 neutron captures). The higher plutonium isotopes are created when the uranium fuel is used for a long time. For high burnup used fuel, the concentrations of the higher plutonium isotopes will be higher than the low burnup fuel that is reprocessed to obtain weapons grade plutonium.

The formation of ^{240}Pu, ^{241}Pu, and ^{242}Pu from ^{238}U
Isotope	Thermal neutron cross section (barns)		Decay Mode	Half-life
Isotope	Capture	Fission	Decay Mode	Half-life
^{238}U	2.683	0.000	α	4.468 × 10^{9} years
^{239}U	20.57	14.11	β^{−}	23.45 minutes
^{239}Np	77.03	–	β^{−}	2.356 days
^{239}Pu	270.7	747.9	α	24,110 years
^{240}Pu	287.5	0.064	α	6,561 years
^{241}Pu	363.0	1012	β^{−}	14.325 years
^{242}Pu	19.16	0.001	α	373,300 years

=== Plutonium-239 ===
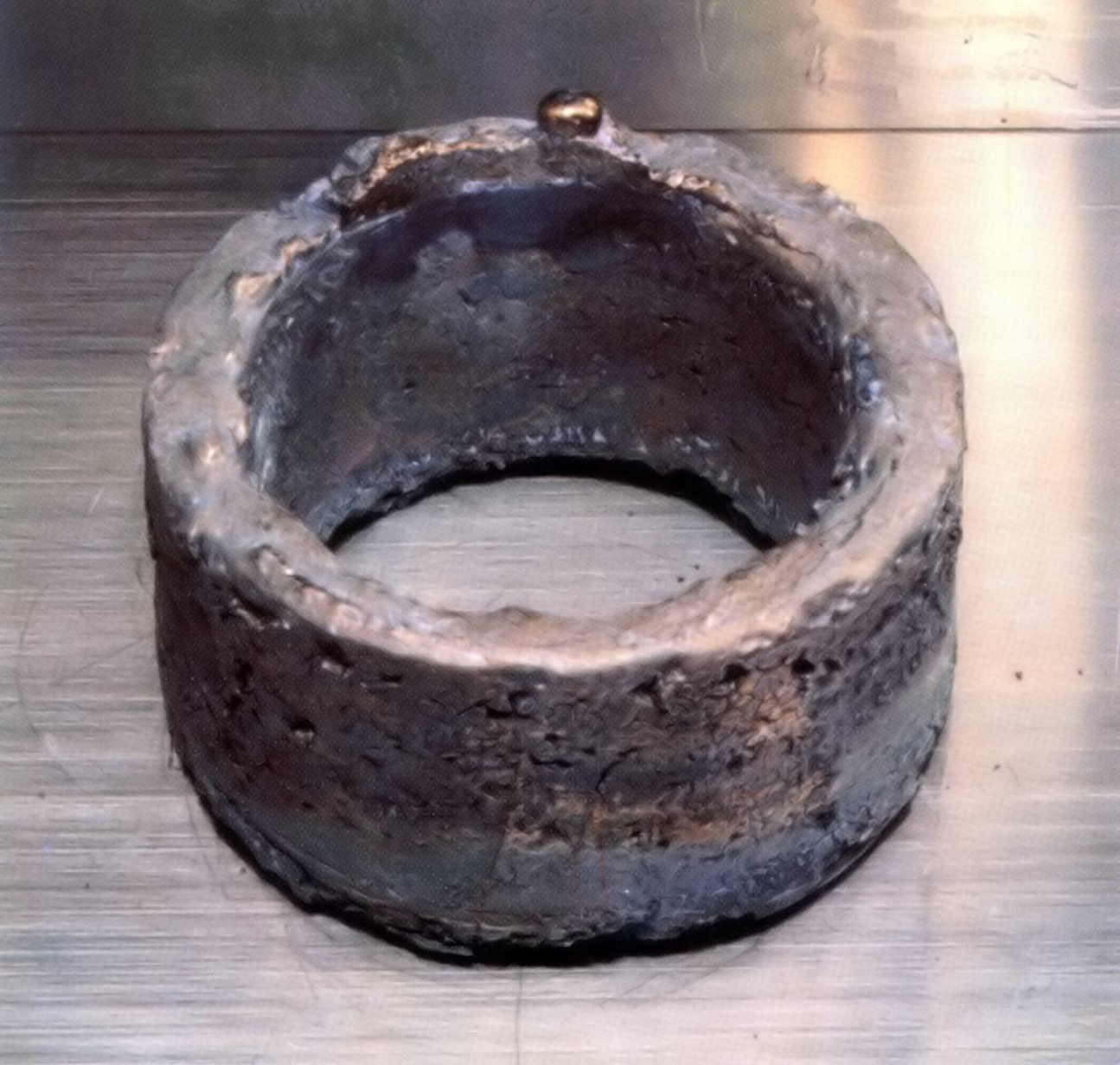
A 5.3 kg ring of weapons-grade electrorefined plutonium, 99.96% purity. This is enough plutonium for an efficient nuclear weapon. The ring shape is needed to depart from a spherical shape and avoid criticality.

^{239}Pu is one of the three fissile materials used for the production of nuclear weapons and in some nuclear reactors as a source of energy. The other fissile materials are uranium-235 and uranium-233. ^{239}Pu is virtually nonexistent in nature. It is made by bombarding uranium-238 with neutrons. Uranium-238 is present in quantity in most reactor fuel; hence ^{239}Pu is continuously made in these reactors. Since ^{239}Pu can itself be split by neutrons to release energy, ^{239}Pu provides a portion of the energy generation in a nuclear reactor.

The formation of ^{239}Pu from ^{238}U
Element	Isotope	Thermal neutron capture cross section (barn)	Thermal neutron fission Cross section (barn)	decay mode	Half-life
U	238	2.68	5·10^{−6}	α	4.47 × 10^{9} years
U	239	22	15	β^{−}	23 minutes
Np	239	30	1	β^{−}	2.36 days
Pu	239	271	750	α	24,110 years

=== Plutonium-238 ===
There are small amounts of ^{238}Pu in the plutonium from usual reactors. However, isotopic separation would be quite expensive compared to another method: when ^{235}U captures a neutron, it is converted to an excited state of ^{236}U. Some of the excited ^{236}U nuclei undergo fission, but some decay to the ground state of ^{236}U by emitting gamma radiation. Further neutron capture creates ^{237}U; which, with a half-life of 7 days, decays to ^{237}Np. Since nearly all neptunium is produced in this way or consists of isotopes that decay quickly, one gets nearly pure ^{237}Np. After chemical separation of neptunium, ^{237}Np is again irradiated by reactor neutrons to be converted to ^{238}Np, which decays to ^{238}Pu with a half-life of 2 days.

The formation of ^{238}Pu from ^{235}U
Element	Isotope	Thermal neutron cross section	decay mode	Half-life
U	235	99	α	703,800,000 years
U	236	5.3	α	23,420,000 years
U	237	—	β^{−}	6.75 days
Np	237	165 (capture)	α	2,144,000 years
Np	238	—	β^{−}	2.11 days
Pu	238	—	α	87.7 years

== Plutonium-240 as an obstacle to nuclear weapons ==
^{240}Pu undergoes spontaneous fission at a small but significant rate (5.8×10^{−6}%). The presence of ^{240}Pu limits the plutonium's use in a nuclear bomb, because a neutron from spontaneous fission starts the chain reaction prematurely, causing an early release of energy that disperses the core before full implosion is reached. This prevents most of the core from participation in the chain reaction and reduces the bomb's yield.

Plutonium consisting of more than about 90% ^{239}Pu is called weapons-grade plutonium; plutonium from spent nuclear fuel from commercial power reactors generally contains at least 20% ^{240}Pu and is called reactor-grade plutonium. However, modern nuclear weapons use fusion boosting, which mitigates the predetonation problem; if the pit can generate a nuclear weapon yield of even a fraction of a kiloton, which is enough to start deuterium–tritium fusion, the resulting burst of neutrons will fission enough plutonium to ensure a yield of tens of kilotons.

Contamination due to ^{240}Pu is the reason plutonium weapons must use the implosion method. Theoretically, pure ^{239}Pu could be used in a gun-type bomb, but achieving this level of purity is prohibitively difficult. ^{240}Pu contamination has proven a mixed blessing. While it created delays and headaches during the Manhattan Project because of the need to develop implosion technology, those same difficulties are a barrier to nuclear proliferation. Implosion bombs are also inherently more efficient and less prone to accidental detonation than are gun-type bombs.

== Sources ==
- Magurno, B. A.; Pearlstein, S., eds. (1981). Proceedings of the conference on nuclear data evaluation methods and procedures. BNL-NCS 51363 (PDF). Vol. II. Upton: Brookhaven National Laboratory. Archived (PDF) from the original on March 8, 2021.
- Miner, William N.; Schonfeld, Fred W. (1968). "Plutonium". In Clifford A. Hampel (ed.). The Encyclopedia of the Chemical Elements. New York (NY): Reinhold Book Corporation. pp. 540–546. LCCN 68029938.
