= Isotopes of uranium =

Isotopes of uranium (_{92}U)
| Main isotopes | | | Decay | |
| Isotope | abundance | half-life (t_{1/2}) | mode | product |
|---|---|---|---|---|
| ^{232}U | synth | 68.9 y | α | ^{228}Th |
| ^{232}U | synth | 68.9 y | SF | – |
| ^{233}U | trace | 1.592×10^{5} y | α | ^{229}Th |
| ^{233}U | trace | 1.592×10^{5} y | SF | – |
| ^{234}U | 0.005% | 2.455×10^{5} y | α | ^{230}Th |
| ^{234}U | 0.005% | 2.455×10^{5} y | SF | – |
| ^{235}U | 0.720% | 7.04×10^{8} y | α | ^{231}Th |
| ^{235}U | 0.720% | 7.04×10^{8} y | SF | – |
| ^{236}U | trace | 2.342×10^{7} y | α | ^{232}Th |
| ^{236}U | trace | 2.342×10^{7} y | SF | – |
| ^{238}U | 99.3% | 4.463×10^{9} y | α | ^{234}Th |
| ^{238}U | 99.3% | 4.463×10^{9} y | SF | – |
| ^{238}U | 99.3% | 4.463×10^{9} y | β^{−}β^{−} | ^{238}Pu |

Standard atomic weight A_{r}°(U)
- 238.02891±0.00003; 238.03±0.01 (abridged)

Uranium (_{92}U) is a naturally occurring radioactive element (radioelement) with no stable isotopes. It has two primordial isotopes, uranium-238 and uranium-235, that have long half-lives and are found in appreciable quantity in Earth's crust. The decay product uranium-234 is also found. Other isotopes such as uranium-233 have been produced in breeder reactors. In addition to isotopes found in nature or nuclear reactors, many isotopes with far shorter half-lives have been produced, ranging from ^{214}U to ^{242}U (except for ^{220}U). The standard atomic weight of natural uranium is 238.02891(3).

Natural uranium consists of three main isotopes, ^{238}U (99.2739–99.2752% natural abundance), ^{235}U (0.7198–0.7202%), and ^{234}U (0.0050–0.0059%). All three isotopes are radioactive (i.e., they are radioisotopes), and the most abundant and stable is uranium-238, with a half-life of 4.463×10^{9} years (about the age of the Earth).

Uranium-238 is an alpha emitter, decaying through the 18-member uranium series into lead-206. The decay series of uranium-235 (historically called actino-uranium) has 15 members and ends in lead-207. The constant rates of decay in these series makes comparison of the ratios of parent-to-daughter elements useful in radiometric dating. Uranium-233 is made from thorium-232 by neutron bombardment.

Uranium-235 is important for both nuclear reactors (energy production) and nuclear weapons because it is the only isotope existing in nature to any appreciable extent that is fissile in response to thermal neutrons, i.e., thermal neutron capture has a high probability of inducing fission. A chain reaction can be sustained with a large enough (critical) mass of uranium-235. Uranium-238 is also important because it is fertile: it absorbs neutrons to produce a radioactive isotope that decays into plutonium-239, which also is fissile.

== List of isotopes ==
| Nuclide (Note: ^{m}U – Excited nuclear isomer.) | Historic name | Z | N | Isotopic mass (Da) (Note: ( ) – Uncertainty (1σ) is given in concise form in parentheses after the corresponding last digits.) (Note: # – Atomic mass marked #: value and uncertainty derived not from purely experimental data, but at least partly from trends from the Mass Surface (TMS).) | Discovery year | Half-life | Decay mode (Note: Modes of decay: EC: / Electron capture; CD: / Cluster decay; SF: / Spontaneous fission) | Daughter isotope (Note: Bold italics symbol as daughter – Daughter product is nearly stable.) (Note: Bold symbol as daughter – Daughter product is stable.) | Spin and parity (Note: ( ) spin value – Indicates spin with weak assignment arguments.) (Note: # – Values marked # are not purely derived from experimental data, but at least partly from trends of neighboring nuclides (TNN).) | Natural abundance (mole fraction) | |
| Nuclide | Historic name | Excitation energy | | | Discovery year | Half-life | Decay mode | Daughter isotope | Spin and parity | Normal proportion | Range of variation |
|---|---|---|---|---|---|---|---|---|---|---|---|
| ^{214}U | | 92 | 122 | | 2021 | 0.52+0.95 −0.21 ms | α | ^{210}Th | 0+ | | |
| ^{215}U | | 92 | 123 | 215.026720(11) | 2015 | 1.4(9) ms | α | ^{211}Th | 5/2−# | | |
| ^{215}U | | 92 | 123 | 215.026720(11) | 2015 | 1.4(9) ms | β^{+}? | ^{215}Pa | 5/2−# | | |
| ^{216}U | | 92 | 124 | 216.024760(30) | 2015 | 2.25+0.63 −0.40 ms | α | ^{212}Th | 0+ | | |
| ^{216m}U | | 2206 keV | | | 2015 | 0.89+0.24 −0.16 ms | α | ^{212}Th | 8+ | | |
| ^{217}U | | 92 | 125 | 217.024660(86)# | 2000 | 19.3+13.3 −5.6 ms | α | ^{213}Th | (1/2−) | | |
| ^{217}U | | 92 | 125 | 217.024660(86)# | 2000 | 19.3+13.3 −5.6 ms | β^{+}? | ^{217}Pa | (1/2−) | | |
| ^{218}U | | 92 | 126 | 218.023505(15) | 1992 | 650+80 −70 μs | α | ^{214}Th | 0+ | | |
| ^{218m}U | | 2117 keV | | | 2007 | 390+60 −50 μs | α | ^{214}Th | 8+ | | |
| ^{218m}U | | 2117 keV | | | 2007 | 390+60 −50 μs | IT? | ^{218}U | 8+ | | |
| ^{219}U | | 92 | 127 | 219.025009(14) | 1993 | 60(7) μs | α | ^{215}Th | (9/2+) | | |
| ^{219}U | | 92 | 127 | 219.025009(14) | 1993 | 60(7) μs | β^{+}? | ^{219}Pa | (9/2+) | | |
| ^{221}U | | 92 | 129 | 221.026323(77) | 2015 | 0.66(14) μs | α | ^{217}Th | (9/2+) | | |
| ^{221}U | | 92 | 129 | 221.026323(77) | 2015 | 0.66(14) μs | β^{+}? | ^{221}Pa | (9/2+) | | |
| ^{222}U | | 92 | 130 | 222.026058(56) | 1983 | 4.7(7) μs | α | ^{218}Th | 0+ | | |
| ^{222}U | | 92 | 130 | 222.026058(56) | 1983 | 4.7(7) μs | β^{+}? | ^{222}Pa | 0+ | | |
| ^{223}U | | 92 | 131 | 223.027961(63) | 1991 | 65(12) μs | α | ^{219}Th | 7/2+# | | |
| ^{223}U | | 92 | 131 | 223.027961(63) | 1991 | 65(12) μs | β^{+}? | ^{223}Pa | 7/2+# | | |
| ^{224}U | | 92 | 132 | 224.027636(16) | 1991 | 396(17) μs | α | ^{220}Th | 0+ | | |
| ^{224}U | | 92 | 132 | 224.027636(16) | 1991 | 396(17) μs | β^{+}? | ^{224}Pa | 0+ | | |
| ^{225}U | | 92 | 133 | 225.029385(11) | 1989 | 62(4) ms | α | ^{221}Th | 5/2+# | | |
| ^{226}U | | 92 | 134 | 226.029339(12) | 1973 | 269(6) ms | α | ^{222}Th | 0+ | | |
| ^{227}U | | 92 | 135 | 227.0311811(91) | 1952 | 1.1(1) min | α | ^{223}Th | (3/2+) | | |
| ^{227}U | | 92 | 135 | 227.0311811(91) | 1952 | 1.1(1) min | β^{+}? | ^{227}Pa | (3/2+) | | |
| ^{228}U | | 92 | 136 | 228.031369(14) | 1949 | 9.1(2) min | α (97.5%) | ^{224}Th | 0+ | | |
| ^{228}U | | 92 | 136 | 228.031369(14) | 1949 | 9.1(2) min | EC (2.5%) | ^{228}Pa | 0+ | | |
| ^{229}U | | 92 | 137 | 229.0335060(64) | 1949 | 57.8(5) min | β^{+} (80%) | ^{229}Pa | (3/2+) | | |
| ^{229}U | | 92 | 137 | 229.0335060(64) | 1949 | 57.8(5) min | α (20%) | ^{225}Th | (3/2+) | | |
| ^{230}U | | 92 | 138 | 230.0339401(48) | 1948 | 20.23(2) d | α | ^{226}Th | 0+ | | |
| ^{230}U | | 92 | 138 | 230.0339401(48) | 1948 | 20.23(2) d | SF ? | (various) | 0+ | | |
| ^{230}U | | 92 | 138 | 230.0339401(48) | 1948 | 20.23(2) d | CD (4.8×10^{−12}%) | ^{208}Pb + ^{22}Ne | 0+ | | |
| ^{231}U | | 92 | 139 | 231.0362922(29) | 1949 | 4.2(1) d | EC | ^{231}Pa | 5/2+# | | |
| ^{231}U | | 92 | 139 | 231.0362922(29) | 1949 | 4.2(1) d | α (.004%) | ^{227}Th | 5/2+# | | |
| ^{232}U | | 92 | 140 | 232.0371548(19) | 1949 | 68.9(4) y | α | ^{228}Th | 0+ | | |
| ^{232}U | | 92 | 140 | 232.0371548(19) | 1949 | 68.9(4) y | CD (8.9×10^{−10}%) | ^{208}Pb + ^{24}Ne | 0+ | | |
| ^{232}U | | 92 | 140 | 232.0371548(19) | 1949 | 68.9(4) y | SF (2.7x10^{−12}%) | (various) | 0+ | | |
| ^{232}U | | 92 | 140 | 232.0371548(19) | 1949 | 68.9(4) y | CD ? | ^{204}Hg + ^{28}Mg | 0+ | | |
| ^{233}U | | 92 | 141 | 233.0396343(24) | 1947 | 1.5919(15)×10^{5} y | α | ^{229}Th | 5/2+ | Trace (Note: Intermediate decay product of ^{237}Np) | |
| ^{233}U | | 92 | 141 | 233.0396343(24) | 1947 | 1.5919(15)×10^{5} y | CD (7.2×10^{−11}%) | ^{209}Pb + ^{24}Ne | 5/2+ | Trace | |
| ^{233}U | | 92 | 141 | 233.0396343(24) | 1947 | 1.5919(15)×10^{5} y | SF ? | (various) | 5/2+ | Trace | |
| ^{233}U | | 92 | 141 | 233.0396343(24) | 1947 | 1.5919(15)×10^{5} y | CD ? | ^{205}Hg + ^{28}Mg | 5/2+ | Trace | |
| ^{234}U (Note: Used in uranium–thorium dating) (Note: Used in uranium–uranium dating) | Uranium II | 92 | 142 | 234.0409503(12) | 1912 | 2.455(6)×10^{5} y | α | ^{230}Th | 0+ | [0.000054(5)] (Note: Intermediate decay product of ^{238}U) | 0.000050– 0.000059 |
| ^{234}U | Uranium II | 92 | 142 | 234.0409503(12) | 1912 | 2.455(6)×10^{5} y | SF (1.64×10^{−9}%) | (various) | 0+ | [0.000054(5)] | 0.000050– 0.000059 |
| ^{234}U | Uranium II | 92 | 142 | 234.0409503(12) | 1912 | 2.455(6)×10^{5} y | CD (1.4×10^{−11}%) | ^{206}Hg + ^{28}Mg | 0+ | [0.000054(5)] | 0.000050– 0.000059 |
| ^{234}U | Uranium II | 92 | 142 | 234.0409503(12) | 1912 | 2.455(6)×10^{5} y | CD (9×10^{−12}%) | ^{210}Pb + ^{24}Ne^{208}Pb + ^{26}Ne | 0+ | [0.000054(5)] | 0.000050– 0.000059 |
| ^{234m}U | | 1421.257(17) keV | | | 1962 | 33.5(20) ms | IT | ^{234}U | 6− | | |
| ^{235}U (Note: Primordial radionuclide) (Note: Used in Uranium–lead dating) (Note: Important in nuclear reactors) | Actino-Uranium; Actin-Uranium | 92 | 143 | 235.0439281(12) | 1935 | 7.04(1)×10^{8} y | α | ^{231}Th | 7/2− | [0.007204(6)] | 0.007198– 0.007207 |
| ^{235}U | Actino-Uranium; Actin-Uranium | 92 | 143 | 235.0439281(12) | 1935 | 7.04(1)×10^{8} y | SF (7×10^{−9}%) | (various) | 7/2− | [0.007204(6)] | 0.007198– 0.007207 |
| ^{235}U | Actino-Uranium; Actin-Uranium | 92 | 143 | 235.0439281(12) | 1935 | 7.04(1)×10^{8} y | CD (8×10^{−10}%) | ^{211}Pb + ^{24}Ne^{210}Pb + ^{25}Ne | 7/2− | [0.007204(6)] | 0.007198– 0.007207 |
| ^{235}U | Actino-Uranium; Actin-Uranium | 92 | 143 | 235.0439281(12) | 1935 | 7.04(1)×10^{8} y | CD (<1.8×10^{−10}%) | ^{207}Hg + ^{28}Mg^{206}Hg + ^{29}Mg | 7/2− | [0.007204(6)] | 0.007198– 0.007207 |
| ^{235m1}U | | 0.076737(18) keV | | | 1957 | 25.7(1) min | IT | ^{235}U | 1/2+ | | |
| ^{235m2}U | | 2500(300) keV | | | 2007 | 3.6(18) ms | SF | (various) | | | |
| ^{236}U | Thoruranium | 92 | 144 | 236.0455661(12) | 1951 | 2.342(4)×10^{7} y | α | ^{232}Th | 0+ | 10^{−11} to 10^{−10} (Note: Intermediate decay product of ^{244}Pu, also produced by neutron capture of ^{235}U) | |
| ^{236}U | Thoruranium | 92 | 144 | 236.0455661(12) | 1951 | 2.342(4)×10^{7} y | SF (9.6×10^{−8}%) | (various) | 0+ | 10^{−11} to 10^{−10} | |
| ^{236}U | Thoruranium | 92 | 144 | 236.0455661(12) | 1951 | 2.342(4)×10^{7} y | CD (2.0×10^{−11}%) | ^{208}Hg + ^{28}Mg^{206}Hg + ^{30}Mg | 0+ | 10^{−11} to 10^{−10} | |
| ^{236m1}U | | 1052.5(6) keV | | | 1973 | 100(4) ns | IT | ^{236}U | 4− | | |
| ^{236m2}U | | 2750(3) keV | | | 1969 | 120(2) ns | IT (87%) | ^{236}U | (0+) | | |
| ^{236m2}U | | 2750(3) keV | | | 1969 | 120(2) ns | SF (13%) | (various) | (0+) | | |
| ^{237}U | | 92 | 145 | 237.0487283(13) | 1940 | 6.752(2) d | β^{−} | ^{237}Np | 1/2+ | Trace (Note: Neutron capture product, parent of trace quantities of ^{237}Np) | |
| ^{237m}U | | 274.0(10) keV | | | 1968 | 155(6) ns | IT | ^{237}U | 7/2− | | |
| ^{238}U | Uranium I | 92 | 146 | 238.050787618(15) | 1896 | 4.463(3)×10^{9} y | α | ^{234}Th | 0+ | [0.992742(10)] | 0.992739– 0.992752 |
| ^{238}U | Uranium I | 92 | 146 | 238.050787618(15) | 1896 | 4.463(3)×10^{9} y | SF (5.44×10^{−5}%) | (various) | 0+ | [0.992742(10)] | 0.992739– 0.992752 |
| ^{238}U | Uranium I | 92 | 146 | 238.050787618(15) | 1896 | 4.463(3)×10^{9} y | β^{−}β^{−} (2.2×10^{−10}%) | ^{238}Pu | 0+ | [0.992742(10)] | 0.992739– 0.992752 |
| ^{238m}U | | 2557.9(5) keV | | | 1970 | 280(6) ns | IT (97.4%) | ^{238}U | 0+ | | |
| ^{238m}U | | 2557.9(5) keV | | | 1970 | 280(6) ns | SF (2.6%) | (various) | 0+ | | |
| ^{239}U | | 92 | 147 | 239.0542920(16) | 1937 | 23.45(2) min | β^{−} | ^{239}Np | 5/2+ | Trace (Note: Neutron capture product; parent of trace quantities of ^{239}Pu) | |
| ^{239m1}U | | 133.7991(10) keV | | | 1975 | 780(40) ns | IT | ^{239}U | 1/2+ | | |
| ^{239m2}U | | 2500(900) keV | | | 1994 | >250 ns | SF? | (various) | 0+ | | |
| ^{239m2}U | | 2500(900) keV | | | 1994 | >250 ns | IT? | ^{239}U | 0+ | | |
| ^{240}U | | 92 | 148 | 240.0565924(27) | 1953 | 14.1(1) h | β^{−} | ^{240m}Np | 0+ | Trace (Note: Intermediate decay product of ^{244}Pu) | |
| ^{240}U | | 92 | 148 | 240.0565924(27) | 1953 | 14.1(1) h | α? | ^{236}Th | 0+ | Trace | |
| ^{241}U | | 92 | 149 | 241.06031(5) | 2023 | 40# min | β^{−} | ^{241}Np | 7/2+# | | |
| ^{242}U | | 92 | 150 | 242.06296(10) | 1979 | 16.8(5) min | β^{−} | ^{242}Np | 0+ | | |
This table header & footer:

== Actinides vs fission products ==
Actinides and fission products by half-life
| Actinides by decay chain | | | | Half-life range (a) | Fission products of ^{235}U by yield |
| 4n (Thorium) | 4n + 1 (Neptunium) | 4n + 2 (Radium) | 4n + 3 (Actinium) | Half-life range (a) | 4.5–7% | 0.04–1.25% | <0.001% |
|---|---|---|---|---|---|---|---|
| ^{228}Ra^{№} | | | | 4–6 a | | ^{155}Eu^{þ} |
| ^{248}Bk | | | | > 9 a |
| ^{244}Cm^{ƒ} | ^{241}Pu^{ƒ} | ^{250}Cf | ^{227}Ac^{№} | 10–29 a | ^{90}Sr | ^{85}Kr | ^{113m}Cd^{þ} |
| ^{232}U^{ƒ} | | ^{238}Pu^{ƒ} | ^{243}Cm^{ƒ} | 29–97 a | ^{137}Cs | ^{151}Sm^{þ} | ^{121m}Sn |
| | ^{249}Cf^{ƒ} | ^{242m}Am^{ƒ} | | 141–351 a | No fission products have a half-life in the range of 100 a–210 ka ... |
| | ^{241}Am^{ƒ} | | ^{251}Cf^{ƒ} | 430–900 a | No fission products have a half-life in the range of 100 a–210 ka ... |
| | | ^{226}Ra^{№} | ^{247}Bk | 1.3–1.6 ka | No fission products have a half-life in the range of 100 a–210 ka ... |
| ^{240}Pu | ^{229}Th | ^{246}Cm^{ƒ} | ^{243}Am^{ƒ} | 4.7–7.4 ka | No fission products have a half-life in the range of 100 a–210 ka ... |
| | ^{245}Cm^{ƒ} | ^{250}Cm | | 8.3–8.5 ka | No fission products have a half-life in the range of 100 a–210 ka ... |
| | | | ^{239}Pu^{ƒ} | 24.1 ka | No fission products have a half-life in the range of 100 a–210 ka ... |
| | | ^{230}Th^{№} | ^{231}Pa^{№} | 32–76 ka | No fission products have a half-life in the range of 100 a–210 ka ... |
| ^{236}Np^{ƒ} | ^{233}U^{ƒ} | ^{234}U^{№} | | 150–250 ka | ^{99}Tc^{₡} | ^{126}Sn |
| ^{248}Cm | | ^{242}Pu | | 327–375 ka | | ^{79}Se^{₡} |
| | | | | 1.33 Ma | ^{135}Cs^{₡} |
| | ^{237}Np^{ƒ} | | | 1.61–6.5 Ma | ^{93}Zr | ^{107}Pd |
| ^{236}U | | | ^{247}Cm^{ƒ} | 15–24 Ma | | ^{129}I^{₡} |
| ^{244}Pu | | | | 80 Ma | ... nor beyond 15.7 Ma |
| ^{232}Th^{№} | | ^{238}U^{№} | ^{235}U^{ƒ№} | 0.7–14.1 Ga | ... nor beyond 15.7 Ma |
₡, has thermal neutron capture cross section in the range of 8–50 barns; ƒ, fissile; №, primarily a naturally occurring radioactive material (NORM); þ, neutron poison (thermal neutron capture cross section greater than 3k barns)

== Uranium-230 ==
Uranium-230 is an artificial isotope of uranium with a half-life of 20.8 days. It has potential to be used in targeted alpha therapy. It is prepared from decay of protactinium-230, which is produced from proton irradiation of thorium targets.

== Uranium-232 ==
Uranium-232 has a half-life of 68.9 years and is a side product in the thorium cycle. It has been cited as an obstacle to nuclear proliferation using ^{233}U, because the intense gamma radiation from ^{208}Tl (a daughter of ^{232}U, produced relatively quickly) makes ^{233}U contaminated with it more difficult to handle. Uranium-232 is a rare example of an even-even isotope that is fissile with both thermal and fast neutrons.

== Uranium-233 ==
Uranium-233 is a fissile isotope that is bred from thorium-232 as part of the thorium fuel cycle. ^{233}U was investigated for use in nuclear weapons and as a reactor fuel. It was occasionally tested but never deployed in nuclear weapons and has not been used commercially as a nuclear fuel. It has been used successfully in experimental nuclear reactors and has been proposed for much wider use as a nuclear fuel. It has a half-life of around 160,000 years.

Uranium-233 is produced by neutron irradiation of thorium-232. When thorium-232 absorbs a neutron, it becomes thorium-233, which has a half-life of only 22 minutes. Thorium-233 beta decays into protactinium-233. Protactinium-233 has a half-life of 27 days and beta decays into uranium-233; some proposed molten salt reactor designs attempt to physically isolate the protactinium from further neutron capture before beta decay can occur.

Uranium-233 usually fissions on neutron absorption but sometimes retains the neutron, becoming uranium-234. The capture-to-fission ratio is smaller than the other two major fissile fuels, uranium-235 and plutonium-239; it is also lower than that of short-lived plutonium-241, but bested by very difficult-to-produce neptunium-236.

== Uranium-234 ==
^{234}U occurs in natural uranium as an indirect decay product of uranium-238, but makes up only 55 parts per million of the uranium because its half-life of 245,500 years is only about 1/18,000 that of ^{238}U. The path of production of ^{234}U is this: ^{238}U alpha decays to thorium-234. Next, with a short half-life, ^{234}Th beta decays to protactinium-234. Finally, ^{234}Pa beta decays to ^{234}U.

^{234}U alpha decays to thorium-230, except for a small percentage of nuclei that undergo spontaneous fission.

Extraction of small amounts of ^{234}U from natural uranium could be done using isotope separation, similar to normal uranium-enrichment. However, there is no real demand in chemistry, physics, or engineering for isolating ^{234}U. Very small pure samples of ^{234}U can be extracted via the chemical ion-exchange process, from samples of plutonium-238 that have aged somewhat to allow some alpha decay to ^{234}U.

Enriched uranium contains more ^{234}U than natural uranium as a byproduct of the uranium enrichment process aimed at obtaining uranium-235, which concentrates lighter isotopes even more strongly than it does ^{235}U. The increased percentage of ^{234}U in enriched natural uranium is acceptable in current nuclear reactors, but (re-enriched) reprocessed uranium might contain even higher fractions of ^{234}U, which is undesirable. This is because ^{234}U is not fissile, though it is fertile. It tends to absorb slow neutrons in a nuclear reactor, becoming fissile ^{235}U.

^{234}U has a neutron capture cross section of about 100 barns for thermal neutrons, and about 700 barns for its resonance integral—the average over neutrons having various intermediate energies. In a nuclear reactor, non-fissile isotopes capture a neutron breeding fissile isotopes. ^{234}U is converted to ^{235}U more easily and therefore at a greater rate than uranium-238 is to plutonium-239 (via neptunium-239), because ^{238}U has a much smaller neutron-capture cross section of just 2.7 barns.

== Uranium-235 ==
Uranium-235 makes up about 0.72% of natural uranium. Unlike the predominant isotope uranium-238, it is fissile, i.e., it can sustain a fission chain reaction. It is the only fissile isotope that is a primordial nuclide or found in significant quantity in nature.

Uranium-235 has a half-life of 704 million years. It was discovered in 1935 by Arthur Jeffrey Dempster. Its fission cross section for slow thermal neutrons is about 584.3±1 barns. For fast neutrons it is on the order of 1 barn. At thermal energy levels, about 5 of 6 neutron absorptions result in fission and 1 of 6 result in neutron capture forming uranium-236. The fission-to-capture ratio improves for faster neutrons.

== Uranium-236 ==
Uranium-236 has a half-life of about 23 million years; and is neither fissile with thermal neutrons, nor very good fertile material, but is generally considered a nuisance and long-lived radioactive waste. It is found in spent nuclear fuel and in the reprocessed uranium made from spent nuclear fuel.

== Uranium-237 ==
Uranium-237 has a half-life of about 6.75 days. It decays into neptunium-237 by beta decay. It was discovered by Japanese physicist Yoshio Nishina in 1940, who in a near-miss discovery, inferred the creation of element 93, but was unable to isolate the then-unknown element or measure its decay properties.

== Uranium-238 ==
Uranium-238 (^{238}U or U-238) is the most common isotope of uranium in nature. It is not fissile, but is fertile: it can capture a slow neutron and after two beta decays become fissile plutonium-239. Uranium-238 is fissionable by fast neutrons, but cannot support a chain reaction because inelastic scattering reduces neutron energy below the range where fast fission of one or more next-generation nuclei is probable. Doppler broadening of ^{238}U's neutron absorption resonances, increasing absorption as fuel temperature increases, is an essential negative feedback mechanism for reactor control.

About 99.274% of natural uranium is uranium-238, which has a half-life of 4.463×10^{9} years. Depleted uranium has an even higher concentration of ^{238}U, and even low-enriched uranium (LEU) is still mostly ^{238}U. Reprocessed uranium is also mainly ^{238}U, with about as much uranium-235 as natural uranium, a comparable proportion of uranium-236, and much smaller amounts of other isotopes of uranium such as uranium-234, uranium-233, and uranium-232.

== Uranium-239 ==
Uranium-239 is usually produced by exposing ^{238}U to neutron radiation in a nuclear reactor. ^{239}U has a half-life of about 23.45 minutes and beta decays into neptunium-239, with a total decay energy of about 1.29 MeV. The most common gamma decay at 74.660 keV accounts for the difference in the two major channels of beta emission energy, at 1.28 and 1.21 MeV.

^{239}Np then, with a half-life of about 2.356 days, beta-decays to plutonium-239.
