= Plutonium-239 =

Isotope of plutonium

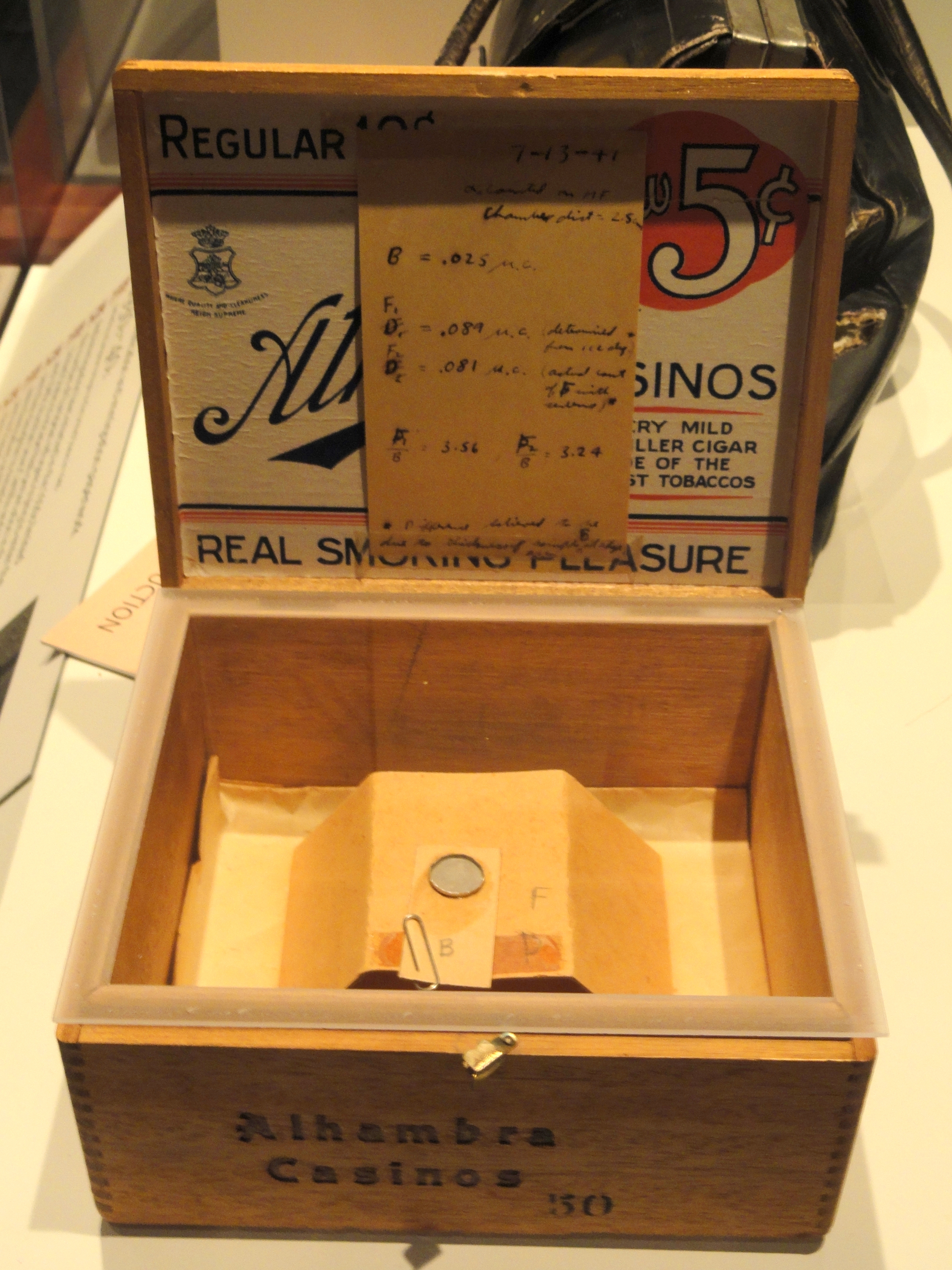
- The first sample of plutonium in which nuclear fission was detected, pictured above, was a sample of plutonium-239.

General
- Symbol: ^{239}Pu
- Names: plutonium-239
- Protons (Z): 94
- Neutrons (N): 145

Nuclide data
- Half-life (t_{1/2}): 24110 years
- Isotope mass: 239.052162 Da
- Spin: +1/2
- Parent isotopes: ^{243}Cm (α)^{239}Am (EC)^{239}Np (β^{−})
- Decay products: ^{235}U

Decay modes
- Decay mode: Decay energy (MeV)
- Alpha decay: 5.245

Plutonium-239 (^{239}Pu or Pu-239) is an isotope of plutonium. Plutonium-239 is the primary fissile isotope used for the production of nuclear weapons, although uranium-235 is also used for that purpose. Plutonium-239 is also one of the three isotopes that have been demonstrated to be usable as fuel in thermal spectrum nuclear reactors, along with uranium-235 and uranium-233. Plutonium-239 has a half-life of 24,110 years.

== Nuclear properties ==
The smaller critical mass of plutonium-239, as well as the ability to produce large amounts of nearly pure ^{239}Pu more cheaply than highly enriched weapons-grade uranium-235, led to its use in nuclear weapons and nuclear power plants. A fission of an atom of uranium-235 (with 0.720% abundance) in a nuclear reactor produces two to three neutrons, and these neutrons can be absorbed by uranium-238 (with 99.3% abundance) to produce plutonium-239 and other isotopes. Plutonium-239 will also absorb neutrons and fission along with the uranium-235 in a reactor.

Of the common nuclear fuels, ^{239}Pu has the smallest critical mass. Its untampered spherical critical mass is about 11 kg (24.2 lbs), 10.2 cm (4") in diameter. Using appropriate triggers, neutron reflectors, implosion geometry, and tampers, the critical mass can be less than half of that.

The fission of one atom of ^{239}Pu generates 207.1 MeV = 3.318 × 10^{−11} J, i.e. 19.98 TJ/mol = 83.61 TJ/kg, or about 23 gigawatt hours/kg.

radiation source (thermal fission of ^{239}Pu)	average energy released [MeV]
Kinetic energy of fission fragments	175.8
Kinetic energy of prompt neutrons	5.9
Energy carried by prompt γ-rays	7.8
Total instantaneous energy	189.5
Energy of β− particles	5.3
Energy of antineutrinos	7.1
Energy of delayed γ-rays	5.2
Total from decaying fission products	17.6
Energy released by radiative capture of prompt neutrons	11.5
Total heat released in a thermal-spectrum reactor (anti-neutrinos do not contribute)	211.5

== Production ==
Plutonium is made from the most abundant uranium isotope uranium-238. ^{239}Pu is normally created in nuclear reactors by transmutation of individual atoms of ^{238}U present in the fuel rods. Occasionally, when an atom of ^{238}U is exposed to neutron radiation, its nucleus will capture a neutron, changing it to ^{239}U. This happens more often with lower kinetic energy (as ^{238}U fission activation is 6.6 MeV). The ^{239}U then rapidly undergoes two β^{−} decays — an emission of an electron and an anti-neutrino ($\bar{\nu}_e$), leaving a proton in the nucleus — the first β^{−} decay transforming the ^{239}U into ^{239}Np, and the second β^{−} decay transforming the ^{239}Np into ^{239}Pu:

$$\ce{{}^{238}_{92}U + {}^{1}_{0}n -> {}^{239}_{92}U ->[\beta^-][23.5\ \ce{min}] {}^{239}_{93}Np ->[\beta^-][2.356\ \ce{d}] {}^{239}_{94}Pu}$$

This reaction is relatively slow, so even after significant exposure, the ^{239}Pu is still mixed with a great deal of ^{238}U (and possibly other isotopes of uranium), oxygen, other components of the original material, and fission products. Only if the fuel has been exposed for a few days in the reactor, can the ^{239}Pu be chemically separated from the rest of the material to yield high-purity ^{239}Pu metal.

^{239}Pu has a higher probability for fission than ^{235}U and a larger number of neutrons produced per fission event, so it has a smaller critical mass. Pure ^{239}Pu also has a reasonably low rate of neutron emission due to spontaneous fission (10 fission/s·kg), making it feasible to assemble a mass that is highly supercritical before a detonation chain reaction begins.

In practice, however, reactor-bred plutonium will invariably contain a certain amount of ^{240}Pu due to the tendency of ^{239}Pu to absorb an additional neutron during production. ^{240}Pu has a high rate of spontaneous fission events (415,000 fission/s-kg), making it an undesirable contaminant. As a result, plutonium containing a significant fraction of ^{240}Pu is not well-suited to use in nuclear weapons; it emits neutron radiation, making handling more difficult, and its presence can lead to a "fizzle" in which a small explosion occurs, destroying the weapon but not causing fission of a significant fraction of the fuel. It is because of this limitation that plutonium-based weapons must be implosion-type, rather than gun-type. Moreover, ^{239}Pu and ^{240}Pu cannot be chemically distinguished, so expensive and difficult isotope separation would be necessary to separate them. Weapons-grade plutonium is defined as containing no more than 7% ^{240}Pu; this is achieved by only exposing ^{238}U to neutron sources for short periods of time to minimize the ^{240}Pu produced (this also importantly reduces the short-lived isotopes ^{238}Pu and ^{241}Pu, and the ^{241}Am from decay of the latter).

Plutonium is classified according to the percentage of the contaminant plutonium-240 that it contains:

- Supergrade 2–3%
- Weapons grade 3–7%
- Fuel grade 7–18%
- Reactor grade 18% or more

A nuclear reactor that is used to produce plutonium for weapons therefore generally has a means for exposing ^{238}U to neutron radiation and for frequently replacing the irradiated ^{238}U with new ^{238}U. A reactor running on unenriched or moderately enriched uranium contains a great deal of ^{238}U. However, most commercial nuclear power reactor designs require the entire reactor to shut down, often for weeks, in order to change the fuel elements. They therefore produce plutonium in a mix of isotopes that is not well-suited to weapon construction. Such a reactor could have machinery added that would permit ^{238}U slugs to be placed near the core and changed frequently, or it could be shut down frequently, so proliferation is a concern; for this reason, the International Atomic Energy Agency inspects licensed reactors often. A few commercial power reactor designs, such as the reaktor bolshoy moshchnosti kanalniy (RBMK) and pressurized heavy water reactor (PHWR), do permit refueling without shutdowns, and they may pose a proliferation risk. By contrast, the Canadian CANDU heavy-water moderated, natural-uranium fueled reactor can also be refueled while operating, but it normally consumes most of the ^{239}Pu it produces in situ; thus, it is not only inherently less proliferative than most reactors, but can even be operated as an "actinide incinerator". The American IFR (Integral Fast Reactor) can also be operated in an incineration mode, having some advantages in not accumulating the plutonium-242 isotope or the long-lived actinides, which cannot be easily burned except in a fast reactor. Also IFR fuel has a high proportion of burnable isotopes, while in CANDU an inert material is needed to dilute the fuel; this means the IFR can burn a higher fraction of its fuel before needing reprocessing. Most plutonium is produced in research reactors or plutonium production reactors called breeder reactors because they produce more plutonium than they consume fuel; in principle, such reactors make extremely efficient use of natural uranium. In practice, their construction and operation is sufficiently difficult that they are generally only used to produce plutonium. Breeder reactors are generally (but not always) fast reactors, since fast neutrons are somewhat more efficient at plutonium production.

Plutonium-239 is more frequently used in nuclear weapons than uranium-235, as it is easier to obtain in quantity capable of criticality. The process of enriching uranium, i.e. increasing the ratio of ^{235}U to ^{238}U to weapons grade, is generally a more lengthy and costly process than the production of plutonium-239 from ^{238}U and subsequent chemical separation.

== In nuclear power reactors ==
In any operating nuclear reactor containing ^{238}U, some plutonium-239 will accumulate in the nuclear fuel. Unlike reactors used to produce weapons-grade plutonium, commercial nuclear power reactors typically operate at a high burnup that allows a significant amount of plutonium to build up in irradiated reactor fuel. Plutonium-239 will be present both in the reactor core during operation and in spent nuclear fuel that has been removed from the reactor at the end of the fuel assembly's service life (typically several years). Spent nuclear fuel commonly contains about 0.8% plutonium-239.

Plutonium-239 present in reactor fuel can absorb neutrons and fission just as uranium-235 can. Since plutonium-239 is constantly being created in the reactor core during operation, the use of plutonium-239 as nuclear fuel in power plants can occur without reprocessing of spent fuel; the plutonium-239 is fissioned in the same fuel rods in which it is produced. Fissioning of plutonium-239 provides more than one-third of the total energy produced in a typical commercial nuclear power plant. Reactor fuel would accumulate much more than 0.8% plutonium-239 during its service life if some plutonium-239 were not constantly being "burned off" by fissioning.

A small percentage of plutonium-239 can be deliberately added to fresh nuclear fuel. Such fuel is called MOX (mixed oxide) fuel, as it contains a mixture of uranium dioxide (UO_{2}) and plutonium dioxide (PuO_{2}). The addition of plutonium-239 reduces the need to enrich the uranium in the fuel.

== Hazards ==
Plutonium-239 emits alpha particles to become uranium-235. As an alpha emitter, plutonium-239 is not particularly dangerous as an external radiation source, but if it is breathed in as dust it is very dangerous and carcinogenic. It has been estimated that a pound (454 grams) of plutonium inhaled as plutonium oxide nano-particles sized to enter and remain in the lungs could give cancer to two million people. However, this estimate is based on the dose-linear no-threshold model which has been criticised.

Orally ingested plutonium is by far less dangerous as only a tiny fraction is absorbed from the gastrointestinal tract; 800 mg would be unlikely to cause a major health risk as far as radiation is concerned. As a heavy metal, plutonium is also chemically toxic.

== See also ==
- Isotopes of plutonium

Lighter: plutonium-238	Plutonium-239 is an isotope of plutonium	Heavier: plutonium-240
Decay product of: curium-243 (α) americium-239 (EC) neptunium-239 (β^{−})	Decay chain of plutonium-239	Decays to: uranium-235 (α)
