= Uranium–uranium dating =

Radiometric dating technique using uranium-234 and uranium-238

Uranium–uranium dating is a radiometric dating technique which compares two isotopes of uranium (U) in a sample: uranium-234 (^{234}U) and uranium-238 (^{238}U). It is one of several radiometric dating techniques exploiting the uranium radioactive decay series, in which ^{238}U undergoes 14 alpha and beta decay events on the way to the stable isotope ^{206}Pb. Other dating techniques using this decay series include uranium–thorium dating and uranium–lead dating.

== Uranium series ==
^{238}U, with a half-life of about 4.5 billion years, decays to ^{234}U by emission of an alpha particle to thorium-234 (^{234}Th), followed quickly by two beta decays. This isotope has a half-life of about 245,000 years. The next decay product, thorium-230 (^{230}Th), has a half-life of about 75,000 years and is used in the uranium–thorium technique. Although analytically simpler, ^{234}U/^{238}U requires knowledge of the ratio at the time the material under study was formed. While this can be achieved for the ocean and therefore precipitates from it, even for those materials (principally marine carbonates), uranium–thorium remains the superior technique up to its age limit, offering intrinsically higher precision. The pure uranium–uranium method is, for that reason, generally used only for samples older than the limit for uranium–thorium dating (~350,000 years).

Unlike other radiometric dating techniques, those using the uranium decay series (except for those using the stable final isotopes ^{206}Pb and ^{207}Pb) compare the ratios of two radioactive unstable isotopes. This complicates calculations as both the parent and daughter isotopes decay over time into other isotopes, but in this case only one ratio and its approach to radioactive equilibrium matter.

In theory, the ^{234}U/^{238}U technique can be useful in dating samples between about 10,000 and 2 million years Before Present (BP), or up to about eight times the half-life of ^{234}U. As such, it provides a useful bridge in radiometric dating techniques between the ranges of ^{230}Th/^{238}U and U–Pb dating (accurate up to the age of the Solar System, but inadequate precision for the youngest ages).

== See also ==
- Carbon dating
- Chronological dating
