= Plutonium-238 =

Isotope of plutonium

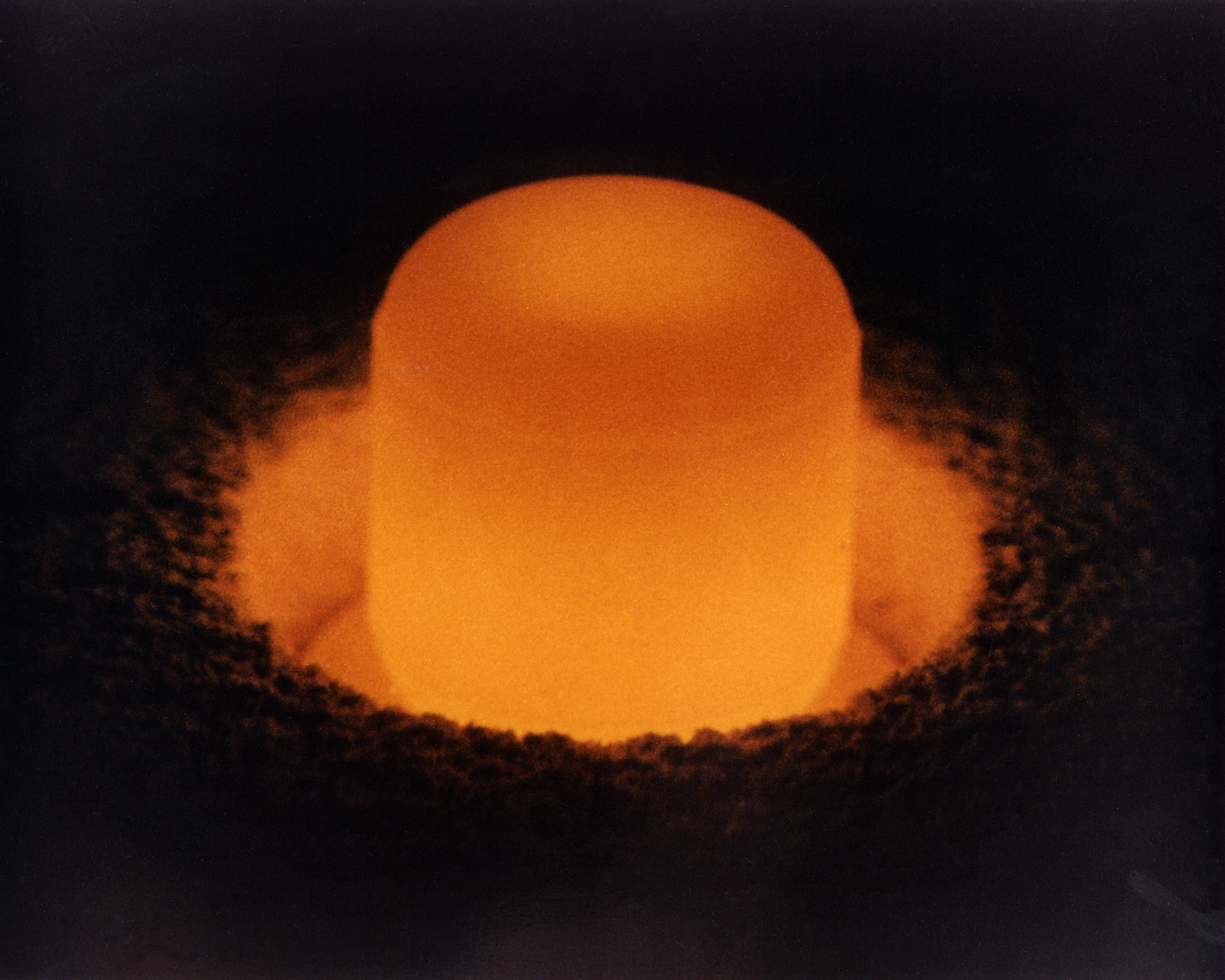
- Plutonium-238 oxide pellet glowing from its decay heat

General
- Symbol: ^{238}Pu
- Names: plutonium-238
- Protons (Z): 94
- Neutrons (N): 144

Nuclide data
- Half-life (t_{1/2}): 87.7 years
- Isotope mass: 238.049553 Da
- Spin: 0
- Parent isotopes: ^{242}Cm (α)^{238}Np (β^{−})^{238}Am (β^{+})
- Decay products: ^{234}U

Decay modes
- Decay mode: Decay energy (MeV)
- Alpha decay: 5.593

Plutonium-238 (^{238}Pu or Pu-238) is a radioactive isotope of plutonium that has a half-life of 87.7 years.

Plutonium-238 is a very powerful alpha emitter; as alpha particles are easily blocked, this makes the plutonium-238 isotope suitable for usage in radioisotope thermoelectric generators (RTGs) and radioisotope heater units. The density of plutonium-238 at room temperature is about 19.8 g/cc. The material will generate about 0.57 watts per gram of ^{238}Pu.

The bare sphere critical mass of metallic plutonium-238 is not precisely known, but its calculated range is between 9.04 and 10.07 kg (19.9 and 22.2 lb).

== History ==
=== Initial production ===
Plutonium-238 was the first isotope of plutonium to be discovered. It was synthesized by Glenn Seaborg and his associates in December 1940 by bombarding uranium-238 with deuterons, creating neptunium-238.

^{238}_{92}U + ^{2}_{1}H → ^{238}_{93}Np + 2n

The neptunium isotope then undergoes β^{−} decay to plutonium-238 with a half-life of 2.099 days.

Plutonium-238 naturally decays to uranium-234 and then continues, after a long period of time, along the radium series to lead-206. Historically, most plutonium-238 has been produced by Savannah River in their weapons reactor, by irradiating neptunium-237 (half life 2.144 Ma) with neutrons.

^{237}_{93}Np + n → ^{238}_{93}Np

Neptunium-237 is a by-product of the production of plutonium-239 weapons-grade material, and when the site was shut down in 1988, ^{238}Pu was mixed with about 16% ^{239}Pu.

=== Manhattan Project ===
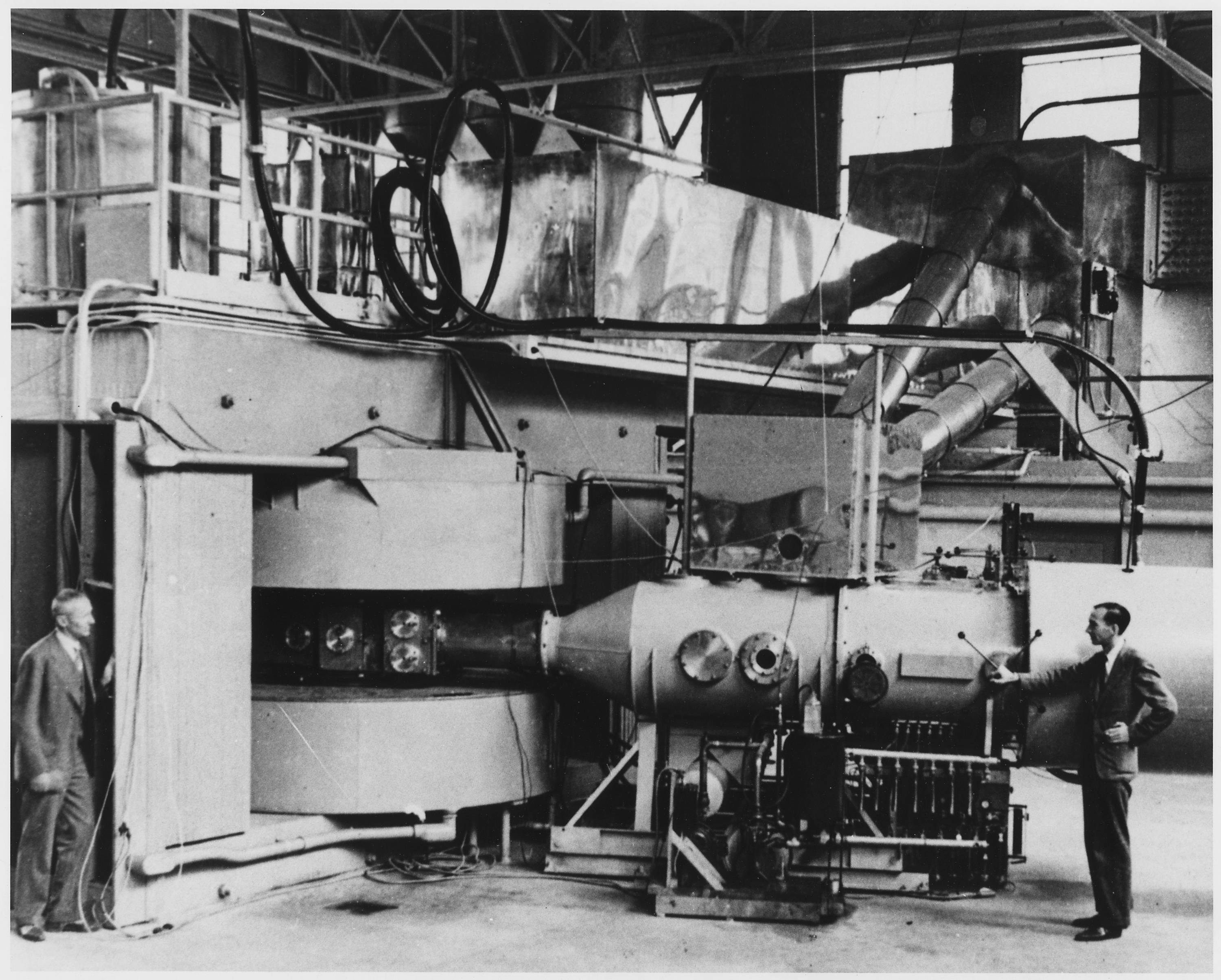
Ernest O. Lawrence's 60-inch cyclotron at the University of California Lawrence Radiation Laboratory, Berkeley, in August, 1939, the most powerful accelerator in the world at the time. Glenn T. Seaborg and Edwin M. McMillan (right) used it to discover plutonium, neptunium, and many other transuranic elements and isotopes, for which they received the 1951 Nobel Prize in chemistry.

Plutonium was first synthesized in 1940 and isolated in 1941 by chemists at the University of California, Berkeley.

The Manhattan Project began shortly after the discovery, with most early research (pre-1944) carried out using small samples manufactured using the large cyclotrons at the Berkeley Rad Lab and Washington University in St. Louis.

Much of the difficulty encountered during the Manhattan Project regarded the production and testing of nuclear fuel. Both uranium and plutonium were eventually determined to be fissile, but in each case they had to be purified to select for the isotopes suitable for an atomic bomb.

With World War II underway, the research teams were pressed for time. Micrograms of plutonium were made by cyclotrons in 1942 and 1943. In late 1943 Robert Oppenheimer is quoted as saying "there's only a twentieth of a milligram in existence."

By his request, the Rad Lab at Berkeley made available 1.2 mg of plutonium by the end of October 1943, most of which was taken to Los Alamos for theoretical work there.

The world's second reactor, the X-10 Graphite Reactor built at a secret site at Oak Ridge, would be fully operational in 1944. In November 1943, shortly after its initial start-up, it produced a minuscule 500 mg. However, this plutonium was mixed with large amounts of uranium fuel and destined for the nearby chemical processing pilot plant for isotopic separation (enrichment). Gram amounts of plutonium would not be available until early 1944.

Industrial-scale production of plutonium only began in March 1945 when the B Reactor at the Hanford Site began operation.

=== Plutonium-238 and human experimentation ===
While samples of plutonium were available in small quantities and being handled by researchers, no one knew what health effects this might have.

Plutonium handling mishaps occurred in 1944, causing alarm in the Manhattan Project leadership as contamination inside and outside the laboratories was becoming an issue. In August 1944, chemist Donald Mastick was sprayed in the face with a solution of plutonium chloride, causing him to accidentally swallow some. Nose swipes taken of plutonium researchers indicated that plutonium was being breathed in. Lead Manhattan Project chemist Glenn Seaborg, discoverer of many transuranium elements including plutonium, urged that a safety program be developed for plutonium research. In a memo to Robert Stone at the Chicago Met Lab, Seaborg wrote "that a program to trace the course of plutonium in the body be initiated as soon as possible ... [with] the very highest priority." This memo was dated January 5, 1944, prior to many of the contamination events of 1944 in Building D where Mastick worked. Seaborg later claimed that he did not at all intend to imply human experimentation in this memo, nor did he learn of its use in humans until far later due to the compartmentalization of classified information.

With bomb-grade enriched plutonium-239 destined for critical research and for atomic weapon production, plutonium-238 was used in early medical experiments as it is unusable as atomic weapon fuel. However, ^{238}Pu is far more dangerous than ^{239}Pu due to its short half-life and being a strong alpha-emitter. It was soon found that plutonium was being excreted at a very slow rate, accumulating in test subjects involved in early human experimentation. This led to severe health consequences for the patients involved.

From April 10, 1945, to July 18, 1947, eighteen people were injected with plutonium as part of the Manhattan Project. Doses administered ranged from 0.095 to 5.9 microcuries (μCi).

Albert Stevens, after a (mistaken) terminal cancer diagnosis which seemed to include many organs, was injected in 1945 with plutonium without his informed consent. He was referred to as patient CAL-1 and the plutonium consisted of 3.5 μCi ^{238}Pu and 0.046 μCi ^{239}Pu, giving him an initial body burden of 3.546 μCi (131 kBq) total activity. The fact that he had the highly radioactive plutonium-238 (produced in the 60-inch cyclotron at the Crocker Laboratory by deuteron bombardment of natural uranium) contributed heavily to his long-term dose. Had all of the plutonium given to Stevens been the long-lived ^{239}Pu as used in similar experiments of the time, Stevens's lifetime dose would have been significantly smaller. The short half-life of 87.7 years of ^{238}Pu means that a large amount of it decayed during its time inside his body, especially when compared to the 24,100 year half-life of ^{239}Pu.

After his initial "cancer" surgery removed many non-cancerous "tumors", Stevens survived for about 20 years after his experimental dose of plutonium before succumbing to heart disease; he had received the highest known accumulated radiation dose of any human patient. Modern calculations of his lifetime absorbed dose give a significant 64 Sv (6400 rem) total.

=== Weapons ===
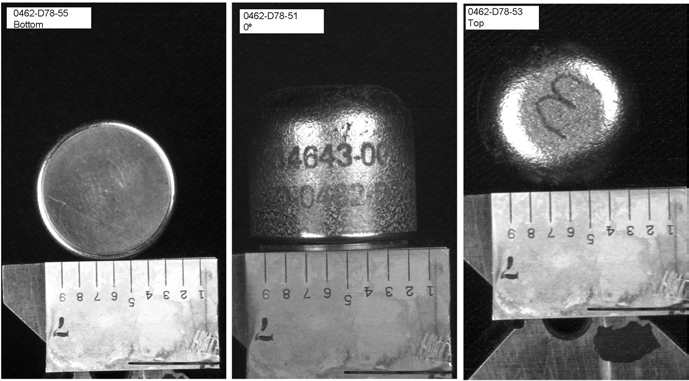
^{238}Pu source from a Milliwatt RTG used in US permissive action links (PAL).

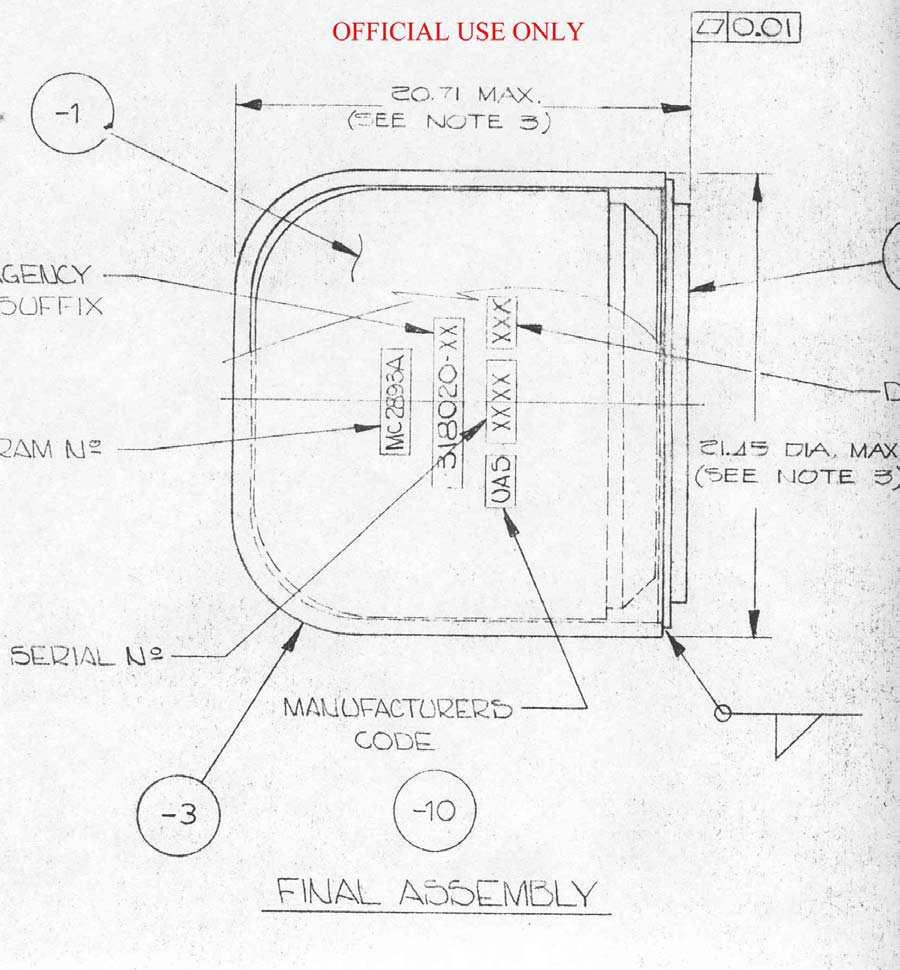
Diagram of the ^{238}Pu Milliwatt RTG source.

The first application of ^{238}Pu was its use in nuclear weapon components made at Mound Laboratories for Lawrence Radiation Laboratory (now Lawrence Livermore National Laboratory). Mound was chosen for this work because of its experience in producing the polonium-210-fueled Urchin initiator and its work with several heavy elements in a Reactor Fuels program. Two Mound scientists spent 1959 at Lawrence in joint development while the Special Metallurgical Building was constructed at Mound to house the project. Meanwhile, the first sample of ^{238}Pu came to Mound in 1959.

The Milliwatt Radioisotopic Thermoelectric Generator is used to provide power to Permissive Action Links (PAL) in US nuclear weapons.

=== Use in radioisotope thermoelectric generators ===
Beginning on January 1, 1957, Mound Laboratories RTG inventors Jordan & Birden were working on an Army Signal Corps contract (R-65-8- 998 11-SC-03-91) to conduct research on radioactive materials and thermocouples suitable for the direct conversion of heat to electrical energy using polonium-210 as the heat source.

In 1961, Capt. R. T. Carpenter had chosen ^{238}Pu as the fuel for the first RTG (radioisotope thermoelectric generator) to be launched into space as auxiliary power for the Transit IV Navy navigational satellite. By January 21, 1963, the decision had yet to be made as to what isotope would be used to fuel the large RTGs for NASA programs.

Early in 1964, Mound Laboratories scientists developed a different method of fabricating the weapon component that resulted in a production efficiency of around 98%. This made available the excess Savannah River ^{238}Pu production for Space Electric Power use just in time to meet the needs of the SNAP-27 RTG on the Moon, the Pioneer spacecraft, the Viking Mars landers, more Transit Navy navigation satellites (precursor to today's GPS) and two Voyager spacecraft, for which all of the ^{238}Pu heat sources were fabricated at Mound Laboratories.

The radioisotope heater units were used in space exploration beginning with the Apollo Radioisotope Heaters (ALRH) warming the Seismic Experiment placed on the Moon by the Apollo 11 mission and on several Moon and Mars rovers, to the 129 LWRHUs warming the experiments on the Galileo spacecraft.

An addition to the Special Metallurgical building weapon component production facility was completed at the end of 1964 for ^{238}Pu heat source fuel fabrication. A temporary fuel production facility was also installed in the Research Building in 1969 for Transit fuel fabrication. With completion of the weapons component project, the Special Metallurgical Building, nicknamed "Snake Mountain" because of the difficulties encountered in handling large quantities of ^{238}Pu, ceased operations on June 30, 1968, with ^{238}Pu operations taken over by the new Plutonium Processing Building, especially designed and constructed for handling large quantities of ^{238}Pu. Plutonium-238 is given the highest relative hazard number (152) of all 256 radionuclides evaluated by Karl Z. Morgan et al. in 1963.

=== Nuclear powered pacemakers ===
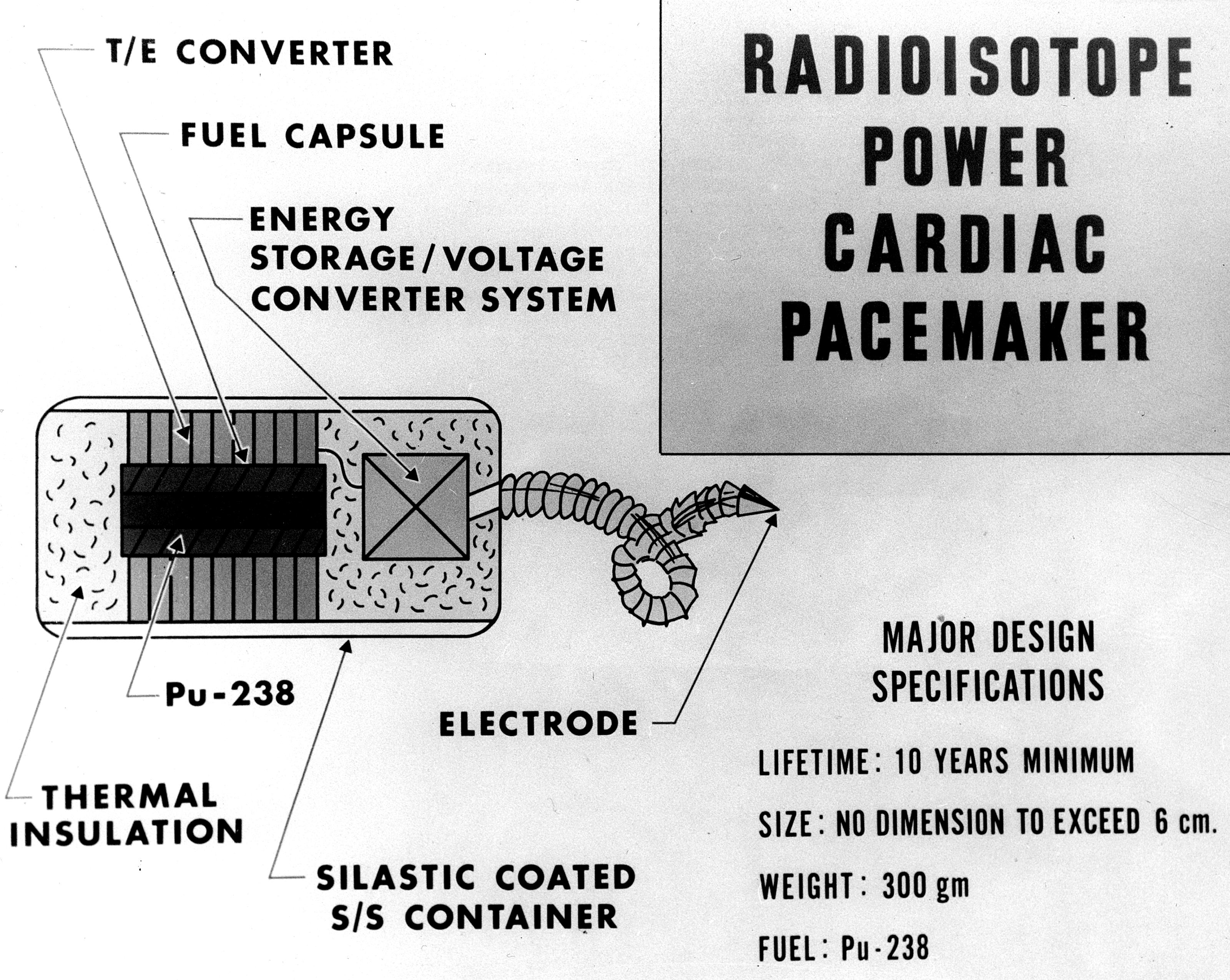
Radioisotope-powered cardiac pacemaker developed by the Atomic Energy Commission in the United States. The atomic battery stimulates the pulsing action of a malfunctioning heart. Circa 1967.

In the United States, when plutonium-238 became available for non-military uses, numerous applications were proposed and tested, including the cardiac pacemaker program that began on June 1, 1966, in conjunction with NUMEC. The last of these units was implanted in 1988, as lithium-powered pacemakers, which had an expected lifespan of 10 or more years without the disadvantages of radiation concerns and regulatory hurdles, made these units obsolete.

As of 2007, there were nine living people with nuclear-powered pacemakers in the United States, out of an original 139 recipients. When these individuals die, the pacemaker is supposed to be removed and shipped to Los Alamos where the plutonium will be recovered.

In a letter to the New England Journal of Medicine discussing a woman who received a Numec NU-5 decades ago that is continuously operating, despite an original $5,000 price tag equivalent to $36,263 in 2025 dollars, the follow-up costs have been about $19,000 ($29,502 in 2025 dollars) compared with $55,000 ($85,400 in 2025 dollars) for a battery-powered pacemaker.

Another nuclear powered pacemaker was the Medtronics “Laurens-Alcatel Model 9000”. Approximately 1600 nuclear-powered cardiac pacemakers and/or battery assemblies have been located across the United States, and are eligible for recovery by the Off-Site Source Recovery Project (OSRP) Team at Los Alamos National Laboratory (LANL).

== Production ==
Reactor-grade plutonium from spent nuclear fuel contains various isotopes of plutonium. ^{238}Pu makes up only one or two percent, but it may be responsible for much of the short-term decay heat because of its short half-life relative to other plutonium isotopes. Reactor-grade plutonium is not useful for producing ^{238}Pu for RTGs because difficult isotopic separation would be needed.

Pure plutonium-238 is prepared by neutron irradiation of neptunium-237, one of the minor actinides that can be recovered from spent nuclear fuel during reprocessing, or by the neutron irradiation of americium in a reactor. The targets are purified chemically, including dissolution in nitric acid to extract the plutonium-238. A 100 kg sample of light water reactor fuel that has been irradiated for three years contains only about 700 grams (0.7% by weight) of neptunium-237, which must be extracted and purified.

In the US, the Department of Energy's Space and Defense Power Systems Initiative of the Office of Nuclear Energy processes ^{238}Pu, maintains its storage, and develops, produces, transports and manages safety of radioisotope power and heating units for both space exploration and national security spacecraft. As of March 2015, a total of 35 kilograms (77 pounds) of ^{238}Pu was available for civil space uses. Out of the inventory, 17 kg (37 lb) remained in a condition meeting NASA specifications for power delivery. Some of this pool of ^{238}Pu was used in a multi-mission radioisotope thermoelectric generator (MMRTG) for the 2020 Mars Rover mission and two additional MMRTGs for a notional 2024 NASA mission. 21 kg (46 lb) would remain after that, including approximately 4 kg (8.8 lb) just barely meeting the NASA specification. Since isotope content in the material is lost over time to radioactive decay while in storage, this stock could be brought up to NASA specifications by blending it with a smaller amount of freshly produced ^{238}Pu with a higher content of the isotope, and therefore energy density.

=== U.S. production ceases and resumes ===
The United States stopped producing bulk ^{238}Pu with the closure of the Savannah River Site reactors in 1988. Since 1993, all of the ^{238}Pu used in American spacecraft has been purchased from Russia. From 1992 to 1994, 10 kilograms were purchased by the US Department of Energy from Russia's Mayak Production Association. Via agreement with Minatom, the US must use plutonium for uncrewed NASA missions, and Russia must use the currency for environmental and social investment in the Chelyabinsk region, affected by long-term radioactive contamination such as the Kyshtym disaster. In total, 16.5 kilograms (36 lb) have been purchased, but Russia is no longer producing ^{238}Pu, and their own supply is reportedly running low.

In February 2013, a small amount of ^{238}Pu was successfully produced by Oak Ridge's High Flux Isotope Reactor, and on December 22, 2015, they reported the production of 50 grams (1.8 ounces) of ^{238}Pu.

In March 2017, Ontario Power Generation (OPG) and its venture arm, Canadian Nuclear Partners, announced plans to produce ^{238}Pu as a second source for NASA. Rods containing neptunium-237 will be fabricated by Pacific Northwest National Laboratory (PNNL) in Washington State and shipped to OPG's Darlington Nuclear Generating Station in Clarington, Ontario, Canada where they will be irradiated with neutrons inside the reactor's core to produce ^{238}Pu.

In January 2019, it was reported that some automated aspects of its production were implemented at Oak Ridge National Laboratory in Tennessee, that are expected to triple the number of plutonium pellets produced each week. The production rate is now expected to increase from 80 pellets per week to about 275 pellets per week, for a total production of about 400 grams per year. The goal now is to optimize and scale-up the processes in order to produce an average of 1.5 kg (3.3 lb) per year by 2025.

In 2023, the DoE delivered 0.5 kg of Pu-238 for NASA missions and expected to produce 1.5 kg per year of plutonium oxide by 2026.

== Applications ==
An atom of plutonium-238 is composed of a nucleus of 94 protons and 144 neutrons, surrounded by 94 electrons in the configuration [Rn] 5f^{6} 7s^{2}.

The main application of ^{238}Pu is as the heat source in radioisotope thermoelectric generators (RTGs). The RTG was invented in 1954 by Mound scientists Ken Jordan and John Birden, who were inducted into the National Inventors Hall of Fame in 2013. They immediately produced a working prototype using a ^{210}Po heat source, and on January 1, 1957, entered into an Army Signal Corps contract (R-65-8- 998 11-SC-03-91) to conduct research on radioactive materials and thermocouples suitable for the direct conversion of heat to electrical energy using polonium-210 as the heat source.

In 1966, a study reported by SAE International described the potential for the use of plutonium-238 in radioisotope power subsystems for applications in space. This study focused on employing power conversions through the Rankine cycle, Brayton cycle, thermoelectric conversion, and thermionic conversion with plutonium-238 as the primary heating element. The heat supplied by the plutonium-238 heating element was consistent between the 400 °C and 1000 °C regime but future technology could reach an upper limit of 2000 °C, further increasing the efficiency of the power systems. The Rankine cycle study reported an efficiency between 15 and 19% with inlet turbine temperatures of 730 °C, whereas the Brayton cycle offered efficiency greater than 20% with an inlet temperature of 840 °C. Thermoelectric converters offered low efficiency (3-5%) but high reliability. Thermionic conversion could provide similar efficiencies to the Brayton cycle if proper conditions reached.

RTG technology was first developed by Los Alamos National Laboratory during the 1960s and 1970s to provide radioisotope thermoelectric generator power for cardiac pacemakers. Of the 250 plutonium-powered pacemakers Medtronic manufactured, twenty-two were still in service more than twenty-five years later, a feat that no battery-powered pacemaker could achieve.

This same RTG power technology has been used in spacecraft such as Pioneer 10 and 11, Voyager 1 and 2, Cassini–Huygens and New Horizons, and in other devices, such as the Mars Science Laboratory and Mars 2020 Perseverance Rover, for long-term nuclear power generation.

== See also ==
- Atomic battery
- Plutonium-239
- Polonium-210

| Lighter: plutonium-237 | Plutonium-238 is an isotope of plutonium | Heavier: plutonium-239 |
| Decay product of: curium-242 (α) americium-238 (β^{+}) neptunium-238 (β^{−}) uranium-238 (β^{−}β^{−}) | Decay chain of plutonium-238 | Decays to: uranium-234 (α) |
