= Uranium-234 =

Isotope of uranium

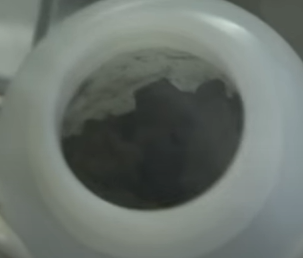
- a sample of uranium-234 oxide

General
- Symbol: ^{234}U
- Names: uranium-234, Uranium II (hist)
- Protons (Z): 92
- Neutrons (N): 142

Nuclide data
- Natural abundance: 0.0055%
- Half-life (t_{1/2}): 245500 years
- Parent isotopes: ^{238}U (alpha, beta, beta)^{234}Pa (β^{−})^{238}Pu (α)
- Decay products: ^{230}Th

Decay modes
- Decay mode: Decay energy (MeV)
- Alpha emission: 4.858

Uranium-234 (^{234}U or U-234) is an isotope of uranium. In natural uranium and in uranium ore, ^{234}U occurs as an indirect decay product of uranium-238, but it makes up only 0.0055% (55 parts per million, or 1/18,000) of the raw uranium because its half-life of just 245,500 years is only about 1/18,000 as long as that of ^{238}U. Thus the ratio of ^{234}U to ^{238}U in a natural sample is equivalent to the ratio of their half-lives. The primary path of production of ^{234}U via nuclear decay is as follows: uranium-238 nuclei emit an alpha particle to become thorium-234. Next, with a short half-life, ^{234}Th nuclei emit a beta particle to become protactinium-234 (^{234}Pa or more usually the isomer ^{234m}Pa). Finally, ^{234}Pa or ^{234m}Pa nuclei emit another beta particle to become ^{234}U nuclei.

Uranium-234 nuclei decay by alpha emission to thorium-230, except for the tiny fraction (here less than 2 per trillion) of nuclei that undergo spontaneous fission.

Disequilibrium between the two uranium isotopes does occur in nature when the uranium is dissolved, and is restored again with the half-life of uranium-234; this is the basis of uranium–uranium dating and must be accounted for in the more common uranium–thorium dating.

Extraction of the rather small amount of ^{234}U from natural uranium would be possible using isotope separation, similar to that used for regular uranium-enrichment. However, there is no real demand in chemistry, physics, or engineering for isolating ^{234}U, and the small amounts that may be wanted for research can be separated chemically from plutonium-238 that have been aged enough to accumulate its alpha decay product, which is ^{234}U.

Enriched uranium contains more ^{234}U than natural uranium as a byproduct of the uranium enrichment process aimed at obtaining uranium-235, which concentrates lighter isotopes even more strongly than it does ^{235}U. IAEA research paper TECDOC-1529 concludes the ^{234}U content of enriched fuel is directly proportional to the degree of ^{235}U—enrichment with 2% ^{235}U resulting in 150 g ^{234}U/ton HM (heavy metals, special meaning, relating to nuclear fuels), and the most common 4.5% ^{235}U enrichment resulting in 400 g ^{234}U/ton HM. The increased percentage of ^{234}U in enriched natural uranium is not harmful to the operation of current nuclear reactors.

Uranium-234 has a neutron-capture cross section of about 100 barns for thermal neutrons, and about 700 barns for its resonance integral—the average of neutrons having a range of intermediate energies. In a nuclear reactor non-fissile isotopes ^{234}U and ^{238}U both capture a neutron, thereby breeding fissile isotopes ^{235}U and ^{239}Pu, respectively. ^{234}U is converted to ^{235}U more easily and therefore at a greater rate than ^{238}U is to ^{239}Pu (via neptunium-239) because ^{238}U has a much smaller neutron-capture cross section of just 2.7 barns. In the reaction ^{234}U + n → ^{235}U reaction, the ^{234}U content of 4.5% enriched fuel drops steadily over the irradiation period falling from 450g/ton HM to 205g/ton HM in fuel with an irradiation of 60GWd/ton HM.

Additionally, (n, 2n) reactions with fast neutrons also convert small amounts of ^{235}U to ^{234}U. This is countered by the rapid conversion of available ^{234}U into ^{235}U through thermal neutron capture. Uranium from spent nuclear fuel may contain as much as 0.010% ^{234}U, or 100 parts per million, lower than the original fuel but still a higher fraction than natural uranium's 55 parts per million. Depleted uranium separated during the enrichment process contains much less ^{234}U (around 0.001%), which reduces the alpha radioactivity almost half (the beta and gamma activity, which is from ^{234}Th and ^{234}Pa, is unchanged) compared to natural uranium having an equilibrium concentration of ^{234}U in which an equal number of decays of ^{238}U and ^{234}U occur.

Uranium-234, as well as uranium-232, is a byproduct, through further neutron capture, in reactors breeding thorium-232 into uranium-233.

Lighter: uranium-233	Uranium-234 is an isotope of uranium	Heavier: uranium-235
Decay product of: plutonium-238 (α) protactinium-234 (β^{−}) neptunium-234 (β^{+})	Decay chain of uranium-234	Decays to: thorium-230 (α)

== See also ==
- Uranium–uranium dating
