= Uranium–thorium dating =

Radiometric dating method

Uranium–thorium dating, also called thorium-230 dating, uranium-series disequilibrium dating or uranium-series dating, is a radiometric dating technique established in the 1960s which has been used since the 1970s to determine the age of calcium carbonate materials such as speleothem or coral. Unlike other commonly used radiometric dating techniques such as rubidium–strontium or uranium–lead dating, the uranium-thorium technique does not measure accumulation of a stable end-member decay product. Instead, it calculates an age from the degree to which secular equilibrium has been restored between the radioactive isotope thorium-230 and its radioactive parent uranium-234 within a sample.

== Background ==
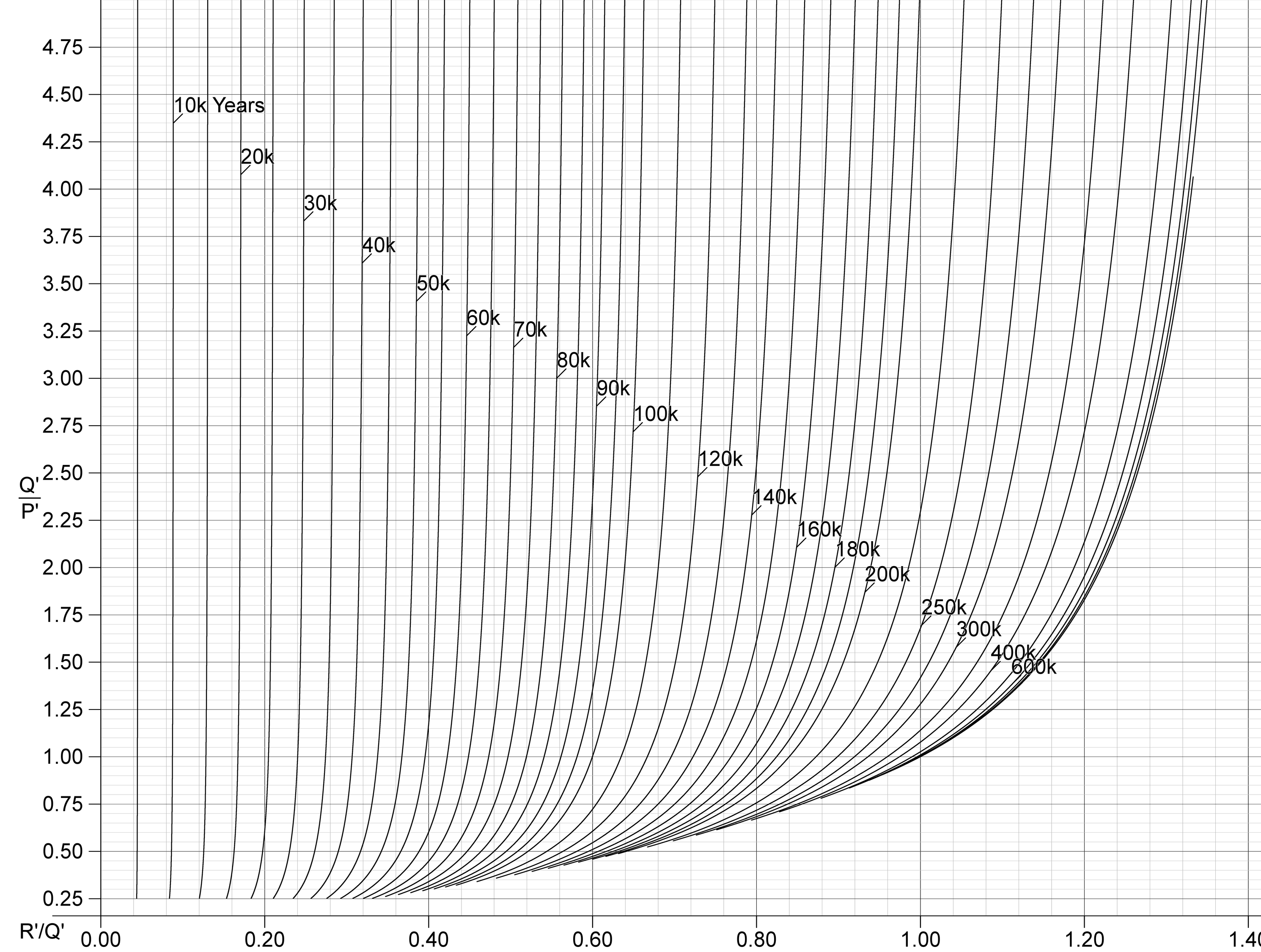
This graph allows one to determine the age from two activity ratios, assuming that thorium is initially absent. The horizontal axis is $\tfrac{R'}{Q'} = \tfrac\ce{^230Th}\ce{^234U},$ while the vertical axis is $\tfrac{Q'}{P'} = \tfrac\ce{^234U}\ce{^238U}.$ Each curve is a linear fractional hyperbola. There is no closed-form expression for the age as a function of the ratios.

Thorium is not soluble in natural water under conditions found at or near the surface of the earth, so materials grown in or from this water do not usually contain thorium. In contrast, uranium is soluble to some extent in all natural water, so any material that precipitates or is grown from such water also contains trace uranium, typically at levels of between a few parts per billion and few parts per million by weight. As time passes after such material has formed, uranium-234 in the sample with a half-life of 245,000 years decays to thorium-230. Thorium-230 is itself radioactive with a half-life of 75,000 years, so instead of accumulating indefinitely (as for instance is the case for the uranium–lead system), thorium-230 instead approaches secular equilibrium with its radioactive parent uranium-234. where the number of thorium-230 decays per year within a sample is equal to the number of thorium-230 atoms produced, which also equals the number of uranium-234 decays per year in the same sample. This limit is represented by the point (1,1) in the graph above.

== History ==
In 1908, John Joly, a professor of geology at Trinity College Dublin, found higher radium contents in deep sediments than in those of the continental shelf, and suspected that detrital sediments scavenged radium out of seawater. Piggot and Urry found in 1942, that radium excess corresponded with an excess of thorium (^{230}Th, the direct parent of radium). It took another 20 years until the technique was applied to terrestrial carbonates (speleothems and travertines). In the late 1980s, the method was refined by mass spectrometry, with significant contributions from Larry Edwards. After Viktor Viktorovich Cherdyntsev's landmark book about uranium-234 had been translated into English, U-Th dating came to widespread research attention in Western geology.

== Methods ==
U-series dating is a family of methods which can be applied to different materials over different time ranges. Each method is named after the isotopes measured to obtain the date, mostly a daughter and its parent. Eight methods are listed in the table below.

U-series dating methods
Isotope ratio measured	Analytical method	Time range (ka)	Materials
^{230}Th/^{234}U	Alpha spec.; mass spec.	1–350	Carbonates, phosphates, organic matter
^{231}Pa/^{235}U	Alpha spec.	1–300	Carbonates, phosphates
^{234}U/^{238}U	Alpha spec.; mass spec.	100–1,000	Carbonates, phosphates
U-trend	Alpha spec.	10–1,000(?)	Detrital sediment
^{226}Ra	Alpha spec.	0.5–10	Carbonates
^{230}Th/^{232}Th	Alpha spec.	5–300	Marine sediment
^{231}Pa/^{230}Th	Alpha spec.	5–300	Marine sediment
^{4}He/U	mass spec. (gas)	20–400(?)	Coral

The ^{234}U/^{238}U method is based on the fact that ^{234}U is dissolved preferentially over ^{238}U because when a ^{238}U atom decays by emitting an alpha ray the daughter atom is displaced from its normal position in the crystal by atomic recoil. This produces a ^{234}Th atom which quickly becomes a ^{234}U atom. Once the uranium is deposited, the ratio of ^{234}U to ^{238}U goes back down to its secular equilibrium (at which the activities of the two are equal), with the distance from equilibrium decreasing by a factor of 2 every 245,000 years.

A material balance gives, for some unknown constant A, these expressions for activity ratios (assuming that the ^{230}Th starts at zero):

$$^{234}\text{U}/^{238}\text{U}=1+A\times 2^{-t/245000}$$
$$^{230}\text{Th}/^{238}\text{U}=1+\frac A{1-75000/245000}\times 2^{-t/245000}-\left(1+\frac A{1-75000/245000}\right)\times 2^{-t/75000}$$

We can solve the first equation for A in terms of the unknown age, t:

$$A=(^{234}\text{U}/^{238}\text{U}-1)\times 2^{t/245000}$$

Putting this into the second equation gives us an equation to be solved for t:

$$^{230}\text{Th}/^{238}\text{U}=1+\frac{^{234}\text{U}/^{238}\text{U}-1}{1-75000/245000}-2^{-t/75000}-\frac{^{234}\text{U}/^{238}\text{U}-1}{1-75000/245000}\times 2^{t/245000-t/75000}$$

Unfortunately there is no closed-form expression for the age, t, but it is easily found using equation solving algorithms.

== Dating limits ==
Uranium–thorium dating has an upper age limit of somewhat over 500,000 years, defined by the half-life of thorium-230, the precision with which one can measure the thorium-230/uranium-234 ratio in a sample, and the accuracy to which one knows the half-lives of thorium-230 and uranium-234. Using this technique to calculate an age, the ratio of uranium-234 to its parent isotope uranium-238 must also be measured.

== Precision ==
U-Th dating yields the most accurate results if applied to precipitated calcium carbonate, that is in stalagmites, travertines, and lacustrine limestones. Bone and shell are less reliable. Mass spectrometry can achieve a precision of ±1%. Conventional alpha counting's precision is ±5%. Mass spectrometry also uses smaller samples.

== See also ==
- Radiocarbon dating
