= Thermoelectric power =

Thermoelectric power may refer to:

- Rate of change of the thermoelectromotive force of a thermocouple with temperature
- Electric power generated from a heat source, such as burning fossil fuel-coal, oil, indirectly through devices like steam turbines
- The thermopower, or Seebeck coefficient, of a material, which governs its thermoelectric properties (a misnomer, as this quantity has units of voltage per unit temperature)
- The power output of a thermoelectric generator that uses the Seebeck effect
- Radioisotope thermoelectric generator

== See also ==
- Thermal power station
