= Ytterbium disilicide =

Names
- Other names Ytterbium silicide, ytterbium(II) silicide

Identifiers
CAS Number	12039-89-3
3D model (JSmol)	Interactive image
ChemSpider	85296285
ECHA InfoCard	100.031.724
EC Number	234-910-6
CompTox Dashboard (EPA)	DTXSID601014258
- InChI: InChI=1S/2Si.Yb Key: SREWIOGHKCMTPP-UHFFFAOYSA-N
- SMILES: [Yb].[Si].[Si]

Properties
Chemical formula	Si_{2}Yb
Molar mass	229.215 g·mol^{−1}
Appearance	Crystals
Density	7.54 g/cm^{3}
Solubility in water	insoluble

Structure
Crystal structure	Orthorhombic
- Except where otherwise noted, data are given for materials in their standard state (at 25 °C [77 °F], 100 kPa). Infobox references

Ytterbium disilicide is a binary inorganic compound of ytterbium and silicon with the chemical formula YbSi_{2}.

== Synthesis ==
An attempt to produce ytterbium disilicide was made by reducing ytterbium oxide with silicon at 1550–1600 °C.

== Physical properties ==
Ytterbium disilicide forms crystals of the hexagonal system, space group P6/mmm.

== Uses ==
YbSi_{2} is a promising thermoelectric material with a high power factor at room temperature as it exhibits large Seebeck coefficient, accompanied by high electrical conductivity, leading to high power factor.
