= Caframo =

Canadian manufacturing company

- Type: Private
- Industry: Manufacturing
- Founded: 1955
- Area served: Worldwide
- Website: CaframoBrands.com

Caframo is a Canadian manufacturing company based in Ontario.

== Background ==
Founded in 1955 by Hans Heidolph, Caframo is privately owned and manufactures products including laboratory overhead stirrers, specialty fans, heaters, thermoelectric fans, and thermoelectric lighting. The company name originally evolved from the development of Canadian Fractional Motors and the products that use them. In 1996, General Manager Tony Solecki purchased the company.

Currently, the company is organized into two divisions: Caframo Brands focuses on consumer products, including the Ecofan, JOI Lamp, specialty marine fans, and heaters; while Caframo Laboratory Solutions focuses on laboratory stirrers and accessories.

In 2018, Caframo was named "Business of the Year" by the Owen Sound and District Chamber of Commerce and was presented with the "Community Conservation Award" from the Owen Sound Field Naturalists. In 2019, the Caframo True North Heater was named as the "Best Overall Electric Heater for RVs" by The Drive magazine.

== Ecofan ==
Ecofan is the very first heat-powered stove fan to market. Since the original Ecofan’s debut, Caframo has introduced several new Ecofan models including the low-temperature BelAir Model 806, patented UltrAir 810, and AirMax 812, all of which are sold to consumers in North America, United Kingdom, Europe, New Zealand, and Japan.

Ecofans use thermoelectric technology to convert a temperature difference into electricity. The base of the Ecofan collects heat from the top of the woodstove, while the fins at the top of the Ecofan, or heat sink, maintain a cool temperature by drawing in cooler air from behind your stove.

The company has been awarded two Vesta Awards from Hearth & Home magazine, in 2007 for the low-temperature BelAir model and in 2019 for the 8200 Series.

== Awards and recognition ==
- National Marine Distributors Association Gold Supply Chain Standards Efficiency Award (2018)
- Fisheries Supply Innovation Award (Lighting) for JOI Lamp (2014)
- SAIL Magazine Pittman Innovation Award Winner for Taku Hatch Fan (2013)
- International Casual Furnishings Association Design Excellence Award (Outdoor Lighting) for JOI Lamp (2011)
- National Hardware Show Retailer’s Choice Award for Caframo Ecofan (2010)
