= Jean Charles Athanase Peltier =

French physicist (1785–1845)

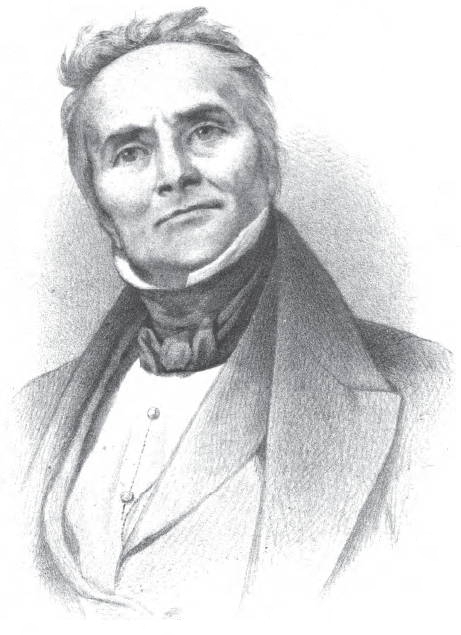
- Born: 22 February 1785; Ham, Kingdom of France
- Died: 27 October 1845 (aged 60); Paris, Kingdom of France
- Occupation: Physicist
- Known for: Peltier effect Peltier electrometer

Jean Charles Athanase Peltier (English: /ʒɒ̃/ /ʃɑːrl/ /ɑːtɑːnɑːz/ /ˈpɛltieɪ/; French: [ʒɑ̃ ʃaʁl atanaz pɛltje]; 22 February 1785 – 27 October 1845) was a French physicist. He was originally a watch dealer, but at the age of 30 began experiments and observations in physics.

Peltier was the author of numerous papers in different departments of physics. His name is specially associated with the thermal effects at junctions in a voltaic circuit, the Peltier effect. Peltier introduced the concept of electrostatic induction (1840), based on the modification of the distribution of electric charge in a material under the influence of a second object closest to it and its own electrical charge.

== Biography ==
Peltier trained as a watchmaker; until his 30s he was a watch dealer. He worked with Abraham Louis Breguet in Paris. Later, he conducted various experiments on electrodynamics and noticed that in an electronic element when current flows through, a temperature gradient or temperature difference is generated at a current flow. In 1836 he published his work and in 1838 his findings were confirmed by Emil Lenz. Peltier dealt with topics from the atmospheric electricity and meteorology. In 1840, he published a work on the causes of hurricanes.

Peltier's numerous papers are devoted in great part to atmospheric electricity, waterspouts, cyanometry and polarization of sky-light, the temperature of water in the spheroidal state, and the boiling-point at high elevations. There are also a few devoted to curious points of natural history. His name will always be associated with the thermal effects at junctions in a voltaic circuit, a discovery of importance comparable with those of Seebeck and Cumming.

Peltier discovered the calorific effect of electric current passing through the junction of two different metals. This is now called the Peltier effect (or Peltier–Seebeck effect). By switching the direction of current, either heating or cooling may be achieved. Junctions always come in pairs, as the two different metals are joined at two points. Thus heat will be moved from one junction to the other.

=== Peltier effect ===
The Peltier effect is the presence of heating or cooling at an electrified junction of two different conductors (1834). His great experimental discovery was the heating or cooling of the junctions in a heterogeneous circuit of metals according to the direction in which an electric current is made to pass round the circuit. This reversible effect is proportional directly to the strength of the current, not to its square, as is the irreversible generation of heat due to resistance in all parts of the circuit. It is found that, if a current pass from an external source through a circuit of two metals, it cools one junction and heats the other. It cools the junction if it be in the same direction as the thermoelectric current which would be caused by directly heating that junction. In other words, the passage of a current from an external source produces in the junctions of the circuit a distribution of temperature which leads to the weakening of the current by the superposition of a thermo-electric current running in the opposite direction.

When electromotive current is made to flow through an electronic junction between two conductors (A and B), heat is removed at the junction. To make a typical pump, multiple junctions are created between two plates. One side heats and the other side cools. A dissipation device is attached to the hot side to maintain cooling effect on the cold side. Typically, the use of the Peltier effect as a heat pump device involves multiple junctions in series, through which a current is driven. Some of the junctions lose heat due to the Peltier effect, while others gain heat. Thermoelectric pumps exploit this phenomenon, as do thermoelectric cooling Peltier modules found in refrigerators.

The Peltier effect generated at the junction per unit time, $\dot{Q}$, is equal to

$\dot{Q} = \left( \Pi_\mathrm{A} - \Pi_\mathrm{B} \right) I,$

where,

$\Pi_A$ ($\Pi_B$) is the Peltier coefficient of conductor A (conductor B), and
$I$ is the electric current (from A to B).

Note: Total heat generated at the junction is not determined by the Peltier effect alone, being influenced by Joule heating and thermal gradient effects.

The Peltier coefficients represent how much heat is carried per unit charge. With charge current continuous across a junction, the associated heat flow will develop a discontinuity if $\Pi_A$ and $\Pi_B$ are different.

The Peltier effect can be considered as the back-action counterpart to the Seebeck effect (analogous to the back-emf in magnetic induction): if a simple thermoelectric circuit is closed then the Seebeck effect will drive a current, which in turn (via the Peltier effect) will always transfer heat from the hot to the cold junction.

The true importance of this "Peltier effect" in the explanation of thermoelectric currents was first clearly pointed out by James Prescott Joule; and Sir William Thomson further extended the subject by showing, both theoretically and experimentally, that there is something closely analogous to the Peltier effect when the heterogeneity is due, not to difference of quality of matter, but to difference of temperature in contiguous portions of the same material. Shortly after Peltier's discovery was published, Lenz used the effect to freeze small quantities of water by the cold developed in a bismuth-antimony junction when a voltaic current was passed through the metals in the order named.

== See also ==
Voltaic Electricity
Magnetic alterations, magnetic saturation, southern magnetic axis, tensions, coercion, contact, induction, magnetic event, metal changes, neighboring electric current, electrical polarity, electrical phenomenon, biasing (grid bias, AC bias), positive charge and electrical polarity (polarity (mutual inductance)), repulsion

Conduction
Electrical conductor, electrical conduction, fast ion conductor, conduction (heat)

Meteorology
Condensation (condensation cloud, condensation reaction), tion through vapor (action through vapor), evaporation, fog

People
Antoine César Becquerel

Instruments
Leyden jar, Influence machine (electrostatic influence),

Materials
Atoms and atomic spheres (kissing number problem), state of matter (chemical state), particles (neutral particle), glazed zinc (Zinc oxide), maghemite, awaruite, oxygen, liquids, ponderable matter, pole figure, chemical polarity, molecular substance, copper-antimony (copper, antimony, alloys list), germanium

Power
Power (physics), electric power, power in an alternating current electrics, transmitter output, effective radiated power, power spectral density signal

Other
Reaction, chemical heat, cohesion, combination, complete, concordance (concordance correlation coefficient), vitreous body, crystal electricity, electric charge, field of view, zone (crystallography), affinity laws (electron affinity, chemical affinity), equilibrium and dynamics (diffusiophoresis), St. Elmo's fire, waves, luminescence (luminance, luminosity), aethereal movements, phys and portion of the aether (quantity of aether rays/aethereal spheres), aethereal glut, nervous system (sense), order of phenomena (critical phenomena, strongly correlated material), will, statistical bias (biased sample, estimator bias), projection spread, quantity of electricity, sphere to another sphere (celestial spheres, esoteric plane), meridian arc (meridian (astronomy), meridian (geography)), resulting segments (gnomonic projection)

== Publications ==
Listed by date

- Collection of pamphlets on electricity. 1833.
- Collection of pamphlets on electromagnetism and electricity. 1835.
- Observations sur une nouvelle espèce de floscularia. 1838.
- Notice des faits principaux et des instrumens nouveaux ajoutés à la science de l'électricité. impr. E.J. Bailly, 1839.
- Notice de faits principaux ajoutés à la science de l'Electricité. Bailly, 1839.
- Observations sur les multiplicateurs et sur les piles thermo-électriques. Imprimerie de E.J. Bailly, 1839.
- Mémoire sur la formation des tables des rapports qu'il y a entre la force d'un courant électrique et la déviation des aiguilles des multiplicateurs: suivi de recherches sur les causes de perturbation des couples thermo-électriques et sur les moyens de s'en garantir dans leur emploi a la mesure des températures moyennes. E.-J. Bailly, 1839.
- Mémoire sur les diverses espèces de brouillards. Hayez, 1841.
- Météorologie: Observations et recherches expérimentales sur les causes qui concourent à la formation des trombes. Soc. Belgian library, 1841.
- Considérations générales sur l'éther, suivies d'une notice sur les étoiles filantes. rue de Seine Saint-Germain, 1844.
- Essai sur la coordination des causes qui précèdent, produisent et accompagnent les phénomènes électriques. Hayez, 1844.
- Observations faites dans les Alpes sur la température d'ébullition de l'eau. Institut de France. Académie royale des sciences, 1844
- Lettre sur la cause des différences existent entre les résultats des expériences de MM. Bravais et Peltier sur la température de l'ébullition de l'eau et les résultats d'expériences de cabinet. Institute. April 22, 1844. (Reports, vol. 18, p. 768.)
- Recherches sur la cause des variations barométriques. Hayez. 1844.
- De la cyanométrie et de la polarimétrie atmosphérique: ou notice sur les additions et les changements fait au cyano-polariscope de M. Arago, pour le rendre cyano- polarimètre dans l'observation de tous les points du ciel. 1845.
- Notice sur le galvanisme. 1845.
- Notice sur les fluides, les forces, et la foudre. rue de Bussy, 6, 1845
- Notice sur la vie et les travaux scientifiques. Bautruche, 1847.
- Robert Hare (M.D., Professor of Chemistry in the University of Pennsylvania.), James Pollard Espy. Of the conclusion arrived at by a Committee of the Academy of Sciences of France, agreeably to which tornados are caused by heat; while agreeably to Peltier's report to the same body, certain insurers had been obliged to pay for a tornado as an electrical storm; also abstracts from Peltier's report; moreover, quotations shewing the ignorance which existed in the Academy respecting [...] the meteor in question [...] with objections to the opinions of Peltier and Espy. Second edition, revised. 1852.

Other

- Notice des faits principaux et des instrumens nouveaux ajoutés à la science de l'Electricité par M. Peltier.
- Mémoires sur l'électricité des vapeurs, sur l'électricité atmosphérique et sur les trombes. Imprimerie de Cosson.
- Météorologie électrique: Première partie

== References and notes ==
General

- The Annual Report Of The Board Of Regents Of The Smithsonian Institution. 1867 Doc. No. 86. 1868. p158+.
- Florian Cajori, A history of physics in its elementary branches. 1922. p269.

Citations
