= Thomas Johann Seebeck =

German physicist (1770–1831)

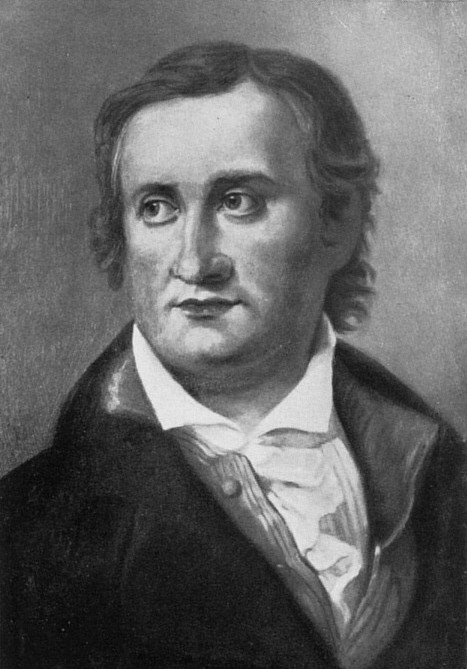
- Born: 9 April 1770; Reval, Russian Empire
- Died: 10 December 1831 (aged 61); Berlin, Kingdom of Prussia, German Confederation
- Education: University of Göttingen
- Known for: Discovering the Seebeck effect
- Scientific career
- Fields: Physics

Thomas Johann Seebeck (German: [ˈtoːmas ˈjoːhan ˈzeːbɛk]; 9 April 1770 – 10 December 1831) was a German physicist who observed a relationship between heat and magnetism. Danish physicist Hans Christian Ørsted later called this phenomenon the thermoelectric effect.

== Early life and experiments ==
Seebeck was born in Reval (today Tallinn) to a wealthy Baltic German merchant family. He received a medical degree in 1802 from the University of Göttingen, but preferred to study physics. From 1821 to 1823, Seebeck performed a series of experiments trying to understand Ørsted's findings from 1820. During his experiments, he observed that a junction of dissimilar metals produces a deflexion on a magnetic needle (compass) when exposed to a temperature gradient. Because Ørsted had discovered that an electric current produces a deflexion on a compass transversal to the wire, Seebeck's results were interpreted as a thermoelectric effect. This is now called the Peltier–Seebeck effect and is the basis of thermocouples and thermopiles.

== Seebeck effect ==
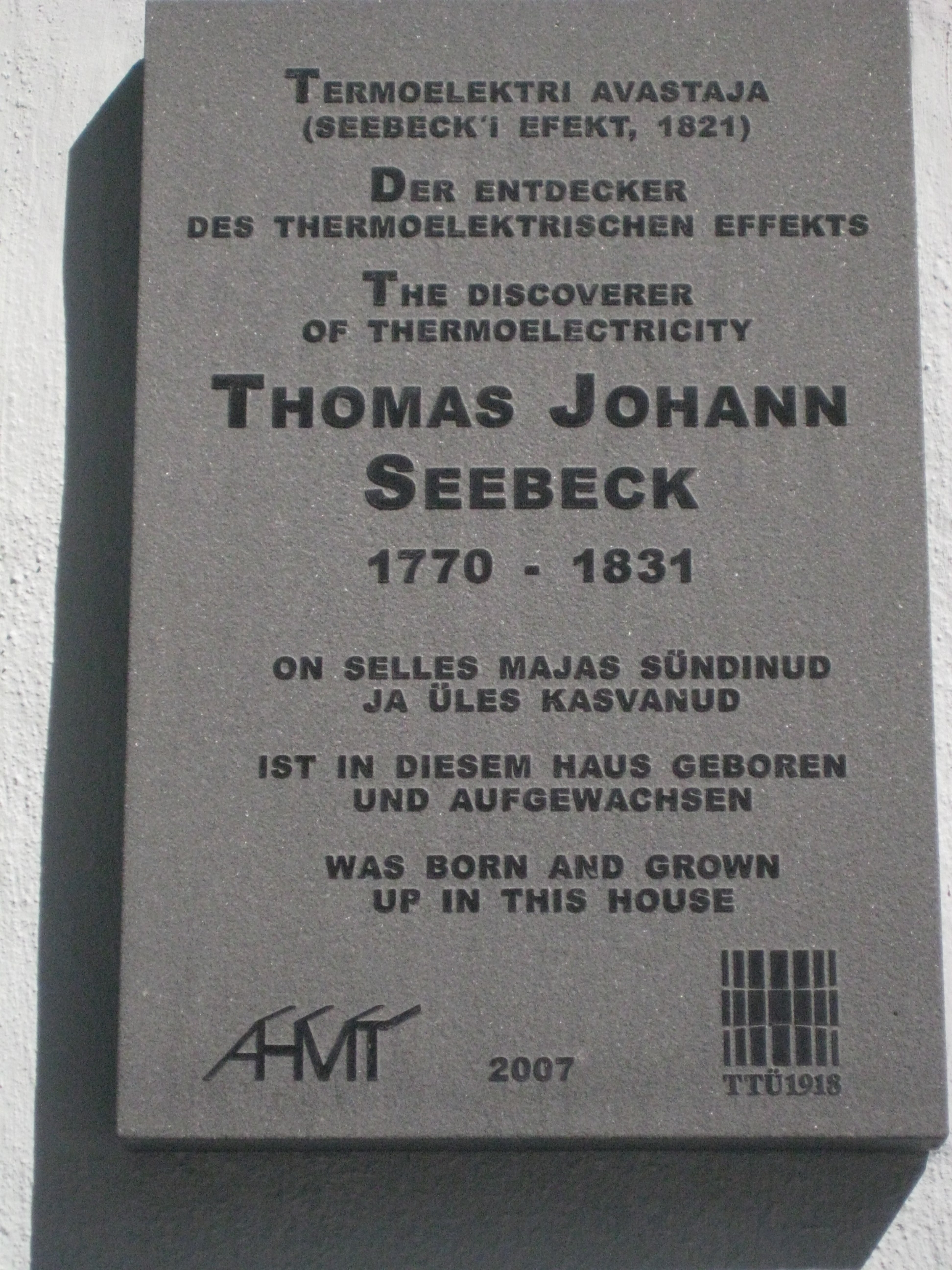
A plaque in honor of Seebeck in Tallinn, Estonia

In 1822, after previous experiments on voltaic current and magnetism, Seebeck found that a circuit made from two dissimilar metals with junctions at different temperatures would deflect a compass magnet. Seebeck believed this was due to magnetism induced by the temperature difference. Based on this result, Seebeck elaborated a table relating different metal junctions and the deflection of the compass. His main conclusion at the end of these experiments was about the influence of metals and volcanoes on Terrestrial magnetism.

During the 1820s, there were at least two different explanations to the relationship between electricity and magnetism. One of them was related to the belief in the polarity of the Nature (Naturphilosophie); another, followed Newton's concepts of force. Ørsted, Seebeck, Ritter and some German chemists and physicists believed on the polarity and looked for a relationship among different forces of Nature, like electricity, magnetism, heat, light and chemical reactions. Following Newton's concept of force were André-Marie Ampère and some French physicists. Ørsted interpreted Seebeck's experiment as supporting a relationship between electricity, magnetism and heat.

Seebeck effect in a thermopile made from iron and copper wires

After the discovery of the electron and its fundamental charge, it was quickly realized that Seebeck's effect was an electric current that is induced, which by Ampere's law deflects the magnet. More specifically, the temperature difference produces an electric potential (voltage) which can drive an electric current in a closed circuit. Today, this effect is known as the Peltier–Seebeck effect.

The voltage produced is proportional to the temperature difference between the two junctions. The proportionality constant (a) is known as the Seebeck coefficient, and often referred to as the thermoelectric power or thermopower. The Seebeck voltage does not depend on the distribution of temperature along the metals between the junctions. This effect is the physical basis for a thermocouple, which is used often for temperature measurement.

$V = a(T_h - T_c)\,\!$

The voltage difference, V, produced across the terminals of an open circuit made from a pair of dissimilar metals, A and B, whose two junctions are held at different temperatures, is directly proportional to the difference between the hot and cold junction temperatures, T_{h} − T_{c}. The voltage or current produced across the junctions of two different metals is caused by the diffusion of electrons from a high electron density region to a low electron density region, as the density of electrons is different in different metals. The conventional current flows in the opposite direction.

If both junctions are kept at same temperature, an equal amount of electron diffuses at both of them. Therefore, the currents at the two junctions are equal and opposite and the net current is zero, and if both the junctions are kept at different temperatures then diffusions at the two junctions are different and hence a different amount of current is produced. Therefore, the net current is non-zero. This phenomenon is known as thermoelectricity.

== Precursors to color photography ==
In 1810, at Jena, Seebeck described the action of light on silver chloride sensitised paper (a technique used by Johann Ritter). He observed that the exposed chemical would sometimes take on an approximate, pale version of the color of the solar spectrum as projected from a prism to which it had been exposed, and also reported the action of light for a wavelengths beyond the violet end of the spectrum. Seebeck reported that violet produced red-brown; blue in the blue segment, which spread into the green; he got black or yellowish in yellow light; and red produced rose red or hortensia red. The experiment could not be preserved because he could not fix the silver chloride to prevent its further reaction to light, though Hannavy reports that "in a spectrum attributed to Seebeck in a private collection the purple and violet currently remain visible," albeit weakly. He corresponded with J. W. Goethe who was writing on the Theory of Colours (Zur Farbenlehre) and who included Seebeck's discovery as an appendix.

== Other achievements ==
In 1808, Seebeck was first to produce and describe the amalgam of potassium. In 1810, he observed the magnetic properties of nickel and cobalt. In 1818, Seebeck discovered the optical activity of the solutions of sugar.

== See also ==
- List of Baltic German scientists
