= Thermoelectric heat pump =

Applies an electric current to heat or cool materials

Thermoelectric heat pumps use the thermoelectric effect, specifically the Peltier effect, to heat or cool materials by applying an electrical current across them. A Peltier cooler, heater, or thermoelectric heat pump is a solid-state active heat pump which transfers heat from one side of the device to the other, with consumption of electrical energy, depending on the direction of the current. Such an instrument is also called a Peltier device, Peltier heat pump, solid state refrigerator, or thermoelectric cooler (TEC) and occasionally a thermoelectric battery. It can be used either for heating or for cooling, although in practice the main application is cooling since heating can be achieved with simpler devices (with Joule heating).

Thermoelectric temperature control heats or cools materials by applying an electrical current across them. A typical Peltier cell absorbs heat on one side and produces heat on the other. Because of this, Peltier cells can be used for temperature control. However, the use of this effect for air conditioning on a large scale (for homes or commercial buildings) is rare due to its low efficiency and high cost relative to other options.

== Thermoelectric cooling ==
This technology is far less commonly applied to refrigeration than vapor-compression refrigeration is. The primary advantages of a Peltier cooler compared to a vapor-compression refrigerator are its lack of moving parts or circulating liquid, very long life, invulnerability to leaks, small size, and flexible shape. Its main disadvantages are high cost for a given cooling capacity and poor power efficiency (a low coefficient of performance or COP). Research and development in thermoelectric cooling focuses on improving energy efficiency, cooling performance, reliability and manufacturing cost through advances in thermoelectric materials, module design and fabrication technologies.

== Operating principle ==
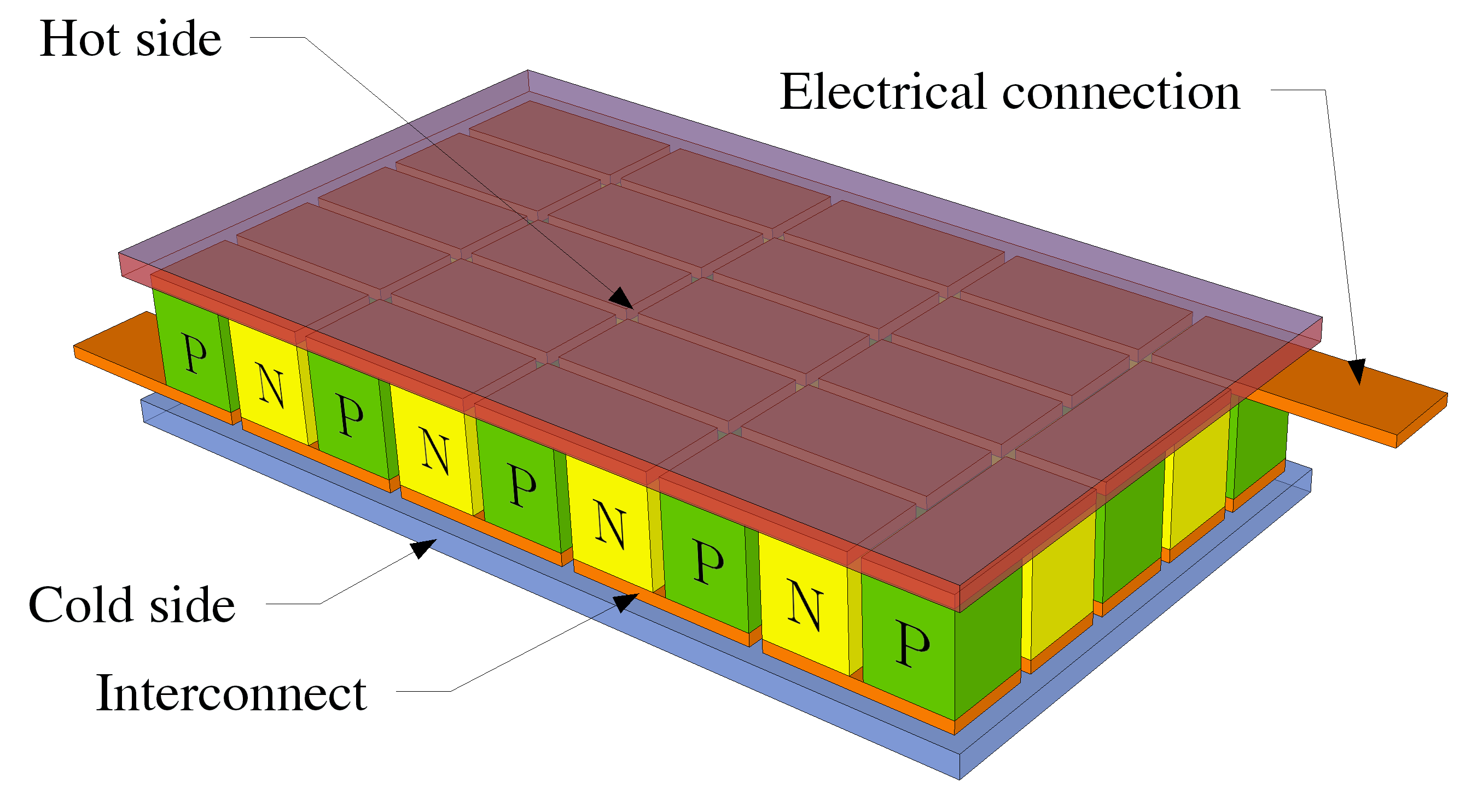
Peltier element schematic. Thermoelectric legs are thermally in parallel and electrically in series.

Video from thermal camera of peltier element

Thermoelectric coolers operate by the Peltier effect (one of three phenomena that make up the thermoelectric effect). A thermoelectric module is made from three components: the conductors, the legs, and the substrate. Many of these modules are connected electrically in series, but thermally in parallel. When a DC electric current flows through the device, it brings heat from one side to the other, so that one side gets colder while the other gets hotter.

The hot side is attached to a heat sink to limit its temperature increase, while the cold side goes below the ambient temperature. In special applications, multiple coolers can be cascaded or staged together for lower temperature, but overall efficiency (COP) drops significantly. The maximum COP of any refrigeration cycle is ultimately limited by the difference in temperature between the hot and cold side. The higher the temperature difference, the lower the maximum theoretical COP. Both temperatures depend on the rate of heat transfer to or away from the device as well as heat movement driven within.

A typical Peltier cell based heat pump can be used by coupling the thermoelectric generators with photovoltaic air cooled panels. Considering the system with an air plant that ensures the possibility of heating on one side and cooling on the other. By changing the configuration it allows both winter and summer acclimatization. These elements are expected to be an effective element for zero-energy buildings, if coupled with solar thermal energy and photovoltaic with particular reference to create radiant heat pumps on the walls of a building.

This acclimatization method ensures the ideal efficiency during summer cooling if coupled with a photovoltaic (PV) generator. The air circulation could be also used to cool PV modules.

The most important engineering requirement is the accurate design of heat sinks to optimize the heat exchange and minimize the fluiddynamic losses.

== Construction ==
=== Design ===
Two unique semiconductors, one n-type and one p-type, are used because they need to have different electron densities. The alternating p & n-type semiconductor pillars are placed thermally in parallel to each other and electrically in series and then joined with a thermally conducting plate on each side, usually ceramic, removing the need for a separate insulator. When a voltage is applied to the free ends of the two semiconductors there is a flow of DC current across the junction of the semiconductors, causing a temperature difference. The side with the cooling plate absorbs heat which is then transported by the semiconductor to the other side of the device.

The cooling ability of the total unit is then proportional to the total cross section of all the pillars, which are often connected in series electrically to reduce the current needed to practical levels. The length of the pillars is a balance between longer pillars, which will have a greater thermal resistance between the sides and allow a lower temperature to be reached but produce more resistive heating, and shorter pillars, which will have a greater electrical efficiency but let more heat leak from the hot to cold side by thermal conduction. For large temperature differences, longer pillars are far less efficient than stacking separate, progressively larger modules; the modules get larger as each layer must remove both the heat moved by the above layer and the waste heat of the layer.

=== Materials ===
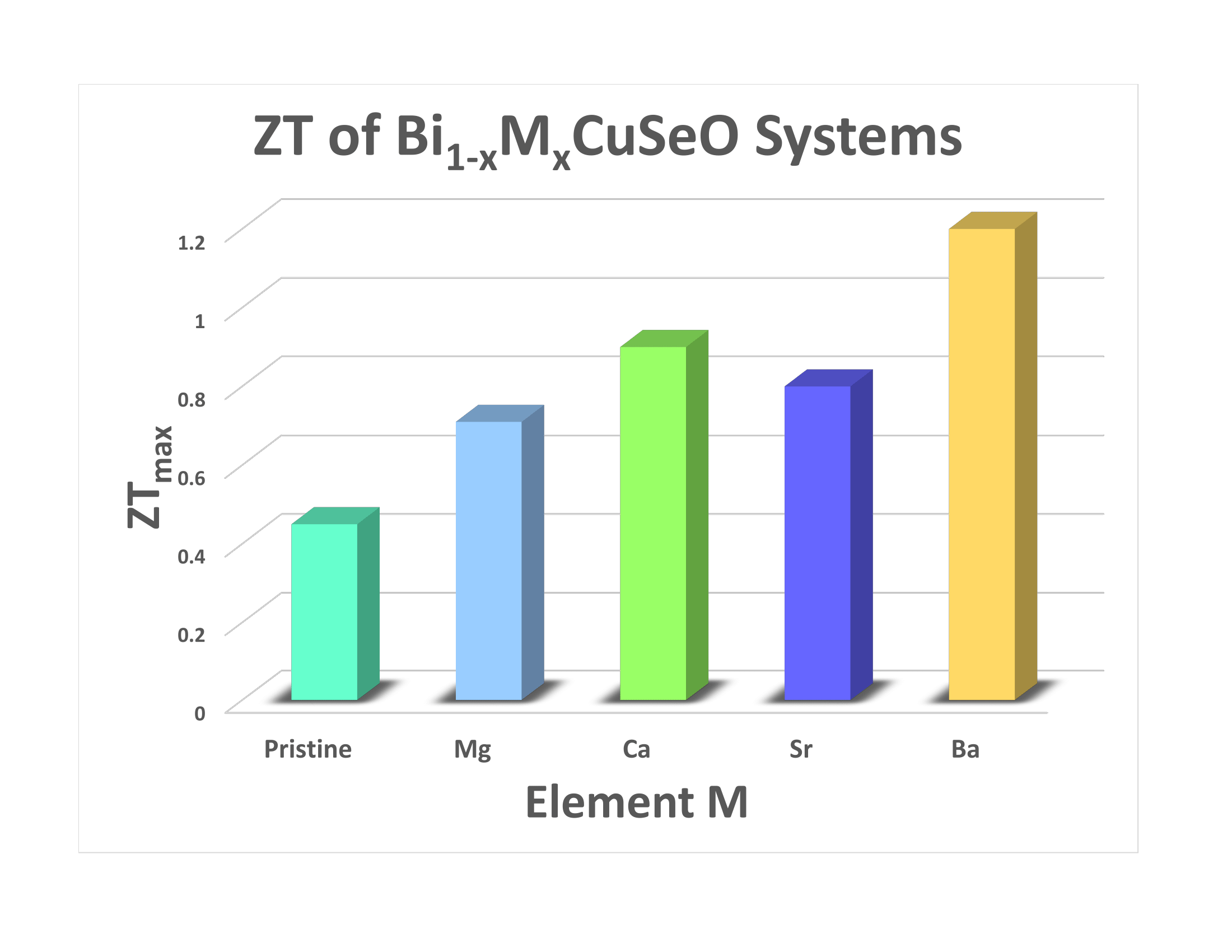
ZT values for various materials and bismuth alloys

Requirements for thermoelectric materials:

- Narrow band-gap semiconductors because of room-temperature operation;
- High electrical conductivity (to reduce electrical resistance, a source of waste heat);
- Low thermal conductivity (so that heat doesn't come back from the hot side to the cool side); this usually translates to heavy elements
- Large unit cell, complex structure;
- Highly anisotropic or highly symmetric;
- Complex compositions.

Materials suitable for high efficiency TEC systems must have a combination of low thermal conductivity and high electrical conductivity. The combined effect of different material combinations is commonly compared using a figure of merit known as ZT, a measure of the system's efficiency. The equation for ZT is given below, where $\alpha$ is the Seebeck coefficient, $\sigma$ is the electrical conductivity and $\kappa$ is the thermal conductivity.

$$\Z\Tau=(\alpha^2\sigma\Tau)/\kappa$$

There are few materials that are suitable for TEC applications since the relationship between thermal and electrical conductivity is usually a positive correlation. Improvements in reduced thermal transport with increased electrical conductivity are an active area of material science research. Common thermoelectric materials used as semiconductors include bismuth telluride, lead telluride, silicon–germanium, and bismuth antimonide alloys. Of these, bismuth telluride is the most commonly used. New high-performance materials for thermoelectric cooling are being actively researched.

For decades, narrow bandgap semiconductors, such as bismuth, tellurium and their compounds, have been used as materials of thermocouples.

=== Identification and characteristics ===
Thermoelectric cooler manufacturers use various product identification and part-numbering conventions. Common designations, such as TEC1-12706, may indicate characteristics including the number of thermoelectric couples and nominal current rating, but these conventions are not universal.

The vast majority of thermoelectric coolers have an ID printed on the cooled side. These universal IDs indicate the size, number of stages, number of couples, and current rating in amps, as seen in the adjacent diagram.

For example, the common thermoelectric element TEC1-12706 has a square shape of 40 mm size and 3–4 mm high, and are found for a few dollars. It is able to move around 60 W or generate a 60 °C temperature difference with a 6 A current. Their electrical resistance is about 1–2 ohm.

== Strengths and weaknesses ==
There are many factors motivating further research on TEC including lower carbon emissions and ease of manufacturing. However, several challenges have arisen.

=== Benefits ===
A significant benefit of TEC systems is that they have no moving parts. This lack of mechanical wear and reduced instances of failure due to fatigue and fracture from mechanical vibration and stress increases the lifespan of the system and lowers the maintenance requirements. Current technologies show the mean time between failures (MTBF) to exceed 100,000 hours at ambient temperatures. The condition of a thermoelectric element can be measured by the change of its AC resistance (ACR); as it wears out, the ACR will increase.

The fact that TEC systems are current-controlled leads to another series of benefits. Because the flow of heat is directly proportional to the applied DC current, heat may be added or removed with accurate control of the direction and amount of electric current. In contrast to methods that use resistive heating or cooling methods that involve gases, TEC allows for an equal degree of control over the flow of heat (both in and out of a system under control). Because of this precise bidirectional heat flow control, temperatures of controlled systems can be precise to fractions of a degree, often reaching precision of milli Kelvin (mK) in laboratory settings.

TEC devices are also more flexible in shape than their more traditional counterparts. They can be used in environments with less space or more severe conditions than a conventional refrigerator. The ability to tailor their geometry allows for the delivery of precise cooling to very small areas. These factors make them a common choice in scientific and engineering applications with demanding requirements where cost and absolute energy efficiency are not primary concerns.

Another benefit of TEC is that it does not use refrigerants in its operation. Prior to their phaseout some early refrigerants, such as chlorofluorocarbons (CFCs), contributed significantly to ozone depletion. Many refrigerants used today also have significant environmental impact with global warming potential or carry other safety risks with them.

=== Disadvantages ===
TEC systems have a number of notable disadvantages. Foremost is their limited energy efficiency compared to conventional vapor-compression systems and the constraints on both the temperature difference and the total heat flux (heat flow) that they are able to generate per unit area. This topic is further discussed in the performance section below. In practice, the mean working life of a low cost thermoelectric module is less than 10 years typically because gasses diffuse through the elastomeric perimeter seal of the module, or the seal bond line fails at the plate.

== Performance ==
Peltier (thermoelectric) performance is a function of ambient temperature, hot and cold side heat exchanger (heat sink) performance, thermal load, Peltier module (thermopile) geometry, and Peltier electrical parameters.

The amount of heat that can be moved is proportional to the current and time.

$Q = PIt$, where P is the Peltier coefficient, I is the current, and t is the time. The Peltier coefficient depends on temperature and the materials the cooler is made of. Magnitude of 10 watt per ampere are common, but this is offset by two phenomena:

- According to Ohm's law, a Peltier module will produce waste heat itself,

$Q_{waste} = RI^2 t$, where R is the resistance.

- Heat will also move from the hot side to the cool side by thermal conduction inside the module itself, an effect which grows stronger as the temperature difference grows.

The result is that the heat effectively moved drops as the temperature difference grows, and the module becomes less efficient. There comes a temperature difference when the waste heat and heat moving back overcomes the moved heat, and the module starts to heat the cool side instead of cooling it further. Conventional single-stage thermoelectric coolers commonly achieve maximum temperature differences of approximately 65–75 K under specified test conditions and at negligible cooling load. Actual temperature differences depend on module design, operating current, hot-side temperature and applied thermal load.

Another issue with performance is a direct consequence of one of their advantages: being small. This means that:

- the hot side and the cool side will be very close to each other (a few millimeters away), making it easier for the heat to go back to the cool side, and harder to insulate the hot and cool side from each other
- a common 40 mm × 40 mm can generate 60 W or more—that is, 4 W/cm^{2} or more—requiring a powerful radiator to move the heat away

In refrigeration applications, thermoelectric junctions have about 1/4 the efficiency compared to conventional means (vapor compression refrigeration): they offer around 10–15% efficiency (COP of 1.0–1.5) of the ideal Carnot cycle refrigerator, compared with 40–60% achieved by conventional compression-cycle systems (reverse Rankine systems using compression/expansion). Due to this lower efficiency, thermoelectric cooling is generally only used in environments where the solid-state nature (no moving parts), low maintenance, compact size, and orientation insensitivity outweighs pure efficiency.

While lower than conventional means, efficiency can be good enough, provided:

- temperature difference is kept as small as possible, and,
- the current is kept low, because the ratio of moved heat over waste heat (for same temperature on the hot and cool side) will be $\frac{Q}{Q_{waste}} = \frac{P}{RI}$.

However, since low current also means a low amount of moved heat, the pumped heat will be low compared to the maximum for each device for the COP to be high.

== Uses ==
Thermoelectric coolers are used for applications that require heat removal ranging from milliwatts to several thousand watts. They can be made for applications as small as a beverage cooler or as large as a submarine or railroad car.

=== Consumer products ===
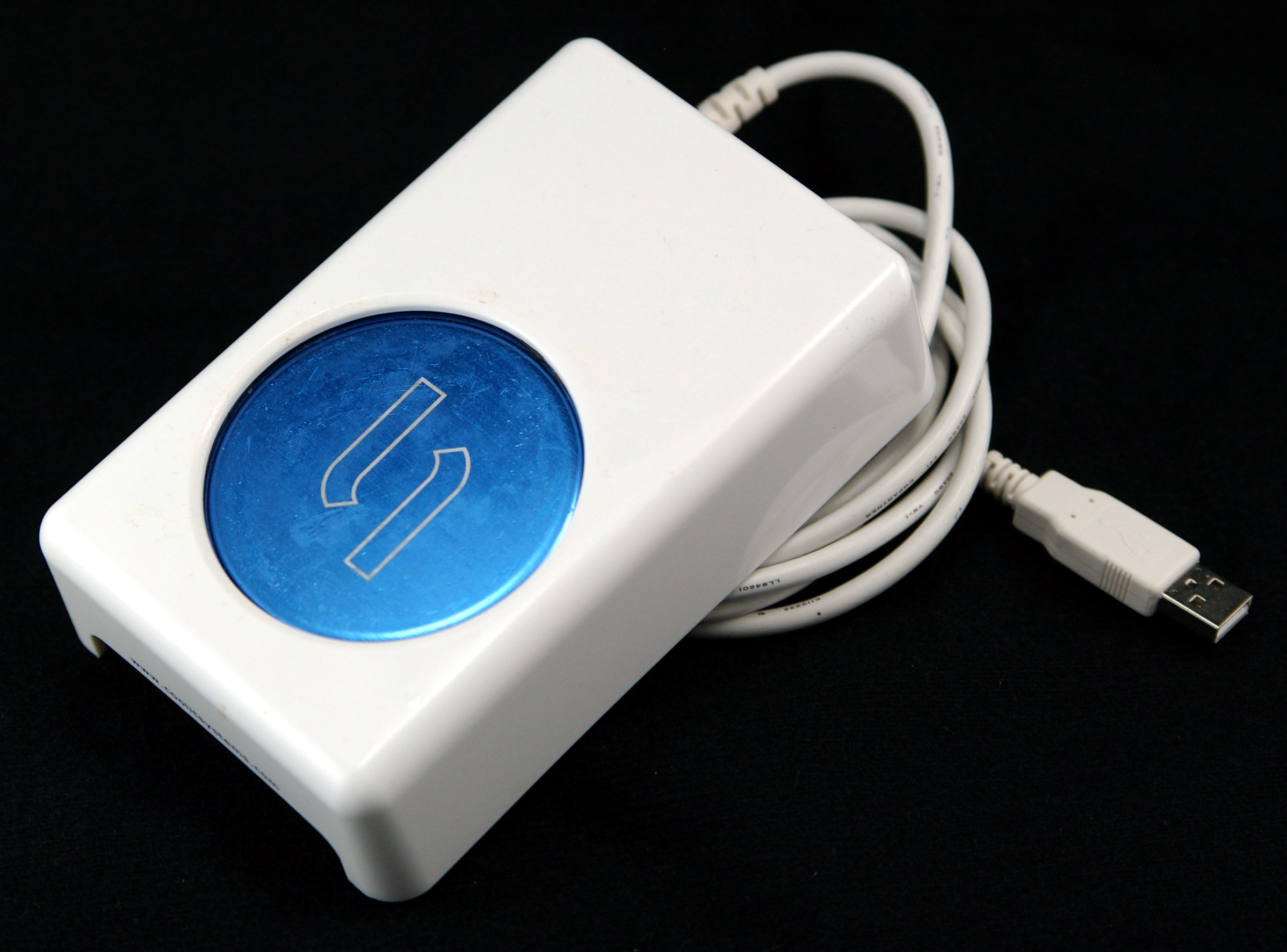
A USB-powered beverage cooler

Peltier elements are commonly used in consumer products. For example, they are used in camping, portable coolers, cooling electronic components, mattress pad sleeping systems and small instruments. They can also be used to extract water from the air in dehumidifiers. A camping/car type (12 V) electric cooler can typically reduce the temperature by up to 20 °C (36 °F) below the ambient temperature, which is 25 °C if the car reaches 45 °C under the sun. Climate-controlled jackets are beginning to use Peltier elements.

Thermoelectric coolers can be used to cool computer components to keep temperatures within design limits or to maintain stable functioning when overclocking. A Peltier cooler with a heat sink or waterblock can cool a chip to well below ambient temperature. Some Intel Core CPUs from the 10th generation and onwards are capable of using the Intel Cryo technology, which uses a combination of thermoelectric cooling and a liquid heat exchanger to deliver a much greater cooling performance than normally possible with standard liquid cooling. Local environment conditions are electronically monitored to prevent shorting from condensation.

=== Acclimatization ===
Thermoelectric heat pumps can be easily used for both local acclimatization for removing local discomfort situations. For example, thermoelectric ceilings are today in an advanced research stage with the aim of increasing indoor comfort conditions according to Fanger, such as the ones that may appear in presence of large glassed surfaces, and for small building acclimatization if coupled with solar systems.

Those systems have the key importance in the direction of new zero emissions passive building because of a very high COP value and the following high performances by an accurate exergy optimization of the system.

At industrial level thermoelectric acclimatization appliances are actually under development.

=== Industrial ===
Thermoelectric coolers are used in many fields of industrial manufacturing and require a thorough performance analysis as they face the test of running thousands of cycles before these industrial products are launched to the market. Some of the applications include laser equipment, thermoelectric air conditioners or coolers, industrial electronics and telecommunications, automotive, mini refrigerators or incubators, military cabinets, IT enclosures, and more.

In fiber-optic applications, where the wavelength of a laser or a component is highly dependent on temperature, Peltier coolers are used along with a thermistor in a feedback loop to maintain a constant temperature and thereby stabilize the wavelength of the device.

Some electronic equipment intended for military use in the field is thermoelectrically cooled.

=== Science and imaging ===
Peltier elements are used in scientific devices. They are a common component in thermal cyclers, used for the synthesis of DNA by polymerase chain reaction (PCR), a common molecular biological technique, which requires the rapid heating and cooling of the reaction mixture for denaturation, primer annealing, and enzymatic synthesis cycles.

With feedback circuitry, Peltier elements can be used to implement highly stable temperature controllers that keep desired temperature within ±0.01 °C. Such stability may be used in precise laser applications to avoid laser wavelength drifting as environment temperature changes.

The effect is used in satellites and spacecraft to reduce temperature differences caused by direct sunlight on one side of a craft by dissipating the heat over the cold shaded side, where it is dissipated as thermal radiation to space. Since 1961, some uncrewed spacecraft (including the Curiosity Mars rover) utilize radioisotope thermoelectric generators (RTGs) that convert thermal energy into electrical energy using the Seebeck effect. The devices can last several decades, as they are fueled by the decay of high-energy radioactive materials.

Peltier elements are also used to make cloud chambers to visualize ionizing radiation. Just by passing an electric current, they can cool vapors below −26 °C without dry ice or moving parts, making cloud chambers easy to make and use.

Photon detectors such as CCDs in astronomical telescopes, spectrometers, or very high-end digital cameras are often cooled by Peltier elements that may be arranged in a multi-stage, cascade refrigeration configuration.This reduces dark counts due to thermal noise. A dark count occurs when a pixel registers an electron caused by thermal fluctuation rather than a photon. On digital photos taken at low light these occur as speckles (or "pixel noise").

They are also used in energy-dispersive spectrometers to cool the sensor crystals, eliminating the necessity of large liquid nitrogen dewars.

== Thermodynamic parameters ==
The performance of a thermoelectric heat pump is characterized by its cooling capacity, heat rejection rate, electrical power consumption, and coefficient of performance (COP). In cooling mode, the COP is defined as the ratio of the heat removed from the cold side to the electrical power supplied:

$$\mathrm{COP}_{cooling} = \frac{\dot{Q}_C}{P_{electrical}}$$

In a simplified steady-state thermoelectric model, assuming constant material properties and equal distribution of Joule heating between the hot and cold sides, the heat transfer rates are determined by the Peltier effect, resistive heating, and thermal conduction.

The rate of heat absorbed at the cold side is:

$$\dot{Q}_C = \alpha I T_C - \frac{I^2R}{2} - K\Delta T$$

The rate of heat rejected at the hot side is:

$$\dot{Q}_H = \alpha I T_H + \frac{I^2R}{2} - K\Delta T$$

The electrical power consumed by the thermoelectric module is:

$$P_{electrical} = \alpha I\Delta T + I^2R$$

According to the conservation of energy, the heat rejected at the hot side equals the heat absorbed at the cold side plus the electrical power supplied:

$$\dot{Q}_H = \dot{Q}_C + P_{electrical}$$

The thermal conductance of a uniform thermoelectric element can be expressed as:

$$K = \frac{kA}{d}$$

where:

- $\dot{Q}_C$ is the rate of heat absorbed at the cold side (W).
- $\dot{Q}_H$ is the rate of heat rejected at the hot side (W).
- $P_{electrical}$ is the electrical input power (W).
- $T_C$ is the absolute temperature of the cold side (K).
- $T_H$ is the absolute temperature of the hot side (K).
- $\Delta T = T_H - T_C$ is the temperature difference (K).
- $\alpha$ is the effective Seebeck coefficient (V/K).
- $I$ is the applied electrical current (A).
- $R$ is the electrical resistance (Ω).
- $K$ is the effective thermal conductance (W/K).
- $k$ is the thermal conductivity (W/(m·K)).
- $A$ is the cross-sectional area (m²).
- $d$ is the length of the element in the direction of heat transfer (m).

For thermoelectric modules containing multiple thermoelectric couples, the effective electrical and thermal parameters account for the arrangement and geometry of the semiconductor elements.

In heating mode, the coefficient of performance is defined as:

$$\mathrm{COP}_{heating} = \frac{\dot{Q}_H}{P_{electrical}}$$

Under steady-state conditions, the relationship between heating and cooling COP is:

$$\mathrm{COP}_{heating} = \mathrm{COP}_{cooling} + 1$$

Both coefficients depend on the operating temperature difference, applied current, electrical resistance, and thermoelectric material properties. The maximum theoretical coefficients of performance for a reversible heat pump operating between two thermal reservoirs are given by the Carnot relations:

$$\mathrm{COP}_{Carnot,cooling} = \frac{T_C}{T_H-T_C}$$

$$\mathrm{COP}_{Carnot,heating} = \frac{T_H}{T_H-T_C}$$

Actual thermoelectric heat pumps operate below these theoretical limits due to electrical resistance, thermal conduction, and other irreversible processes. More advanced models also account for temperature-dependent thermoelectric properties and the Thomson effect.

=== Experimental ===
Around 1955, RCA Laboratories built a refrigerator and a small room that was air conditioned using the Peltier effect. These were research demonstrations and did not result in products. The air conditioner was one of the "birthday presents" asked for by CEO David Sarnoff to challenge the researchers. One of the lead researchers was Nils E. Lindenblad.

== See also ==
- Thermoelectric generator, which exploits the Seebeck effect
- Thermoacoustics
- Thermoelectric materials
