= Barocaloric material =

Thermic response to pressure change

Barocaloric materials are characterized by strong, reversible thermic responses to changes in pressure. Many involve solid-to-solid phase changes from disordered to ordered and rigid under increased pressure, releasing heat. Barocaloric solids undergo solid-to-solid phase change. One barocaloric material processes heat without a phase change: natural rubber.

== Input energy ==
Barocaloric effects can be achieved at pressures above 200 MPa for intermetallics or about 100 MPa in plastic crystals. However, NH_{4}I changes phase at pressures of 80 MPa. The hybrid organic–inorganic layered perovskite (CH_{3}–(CH_{2})n−1–NH_{3})_{2}MnCl_{4} (n = 9,10), shows reversible barocaloric entropy change of ΔSr ~ 218, 230 J kg−1 K−1 at 0.08 GPa at 294-311.5 K (transition temperature).

Barocaloric materials are one of several classes of materials that undergo caloric phase transitions. The others are magnetocaloric, electrocaloric, and elastocaloric. Magnetocaloric effects typically require field strengths larger than 2 T, while electrocaloric materials require field strengths in the kV to MV/m range. Elastocaloric materials may require force levels as large as 700 MPa.

== Potential applications ==
Barocaloric materials have potential use as refrigerants in cooling systems instead of gases such as hydrofluorocarbons. cycles, the pressure then drives a solid-to-solid phase change. A prototype air conditioner was made from a metal tube filled with a metal-halide perovskite (the refrigerant) and water or oil (heat/pressure transport material). A piston pressurizes the liquid.

Another project used NH_{4}I as the refrigerant. It achieved reversible entropy changes of $\Delta {S}_{{P}_{0}\to P}^{{{\max }}}$ ~71 J K^{−1} kg^{−1} at ambient temperature. The phase transition temperature is a function of pressure, varying at a rate of ~0.79 K MPa−1. The accompanying saturation driving pressure is ~40 MPa, a barocaloric strength of $\left|\Delta {S}_{{P}_{0}\to P}^{{{\max }}}/\Delta P\right|$ ~1.78 J K−1 kg−1 MPa−1, and a temperature span of ~41 K under 80 MPa. Neutron scattering characterizations of crystal structures/atomic dynamics show that reorientation-vibration coupling is responsible for the pressure sensitivity.

== See also ==
- Thermoelectric effect
