= Thermoelectric materials =

Materials whose temperature variance leads to voltage change

Thermoelectric materials show the thermoelectric effect in a strong or convenient form.

The thermoelectric effect refers to phenomena by which either a temperature difference creates an electric potential or an electric current creates a temperature difference. These phenomena are known more specifically as the Seebeck effect (creating a voltage from temperature difference), Peltier effect (driving heat flow with an electric current), and Thomson effect (reversible heating or cooling within a conductor when there is both an electric current and a temperature gradient). While all materials have a nonzero thermoelectric effect, in most materials it is too small to be useful. However, low-cost materials that have a sufficiently strong thermoelectric effect (and other required properties) are also considered for applications including power generation and refrigeration. The most commonly used thermoelectric material is based on bismuth telluride (Bi_{2}Te_{3}).

Thermoelectric materials are used in thermoelectric systems for cooling or heating in niche applications, and are being studied as a way to regenerate electricity from waste heat. Research in the field is still driven by materials development, primarily in optimizing transport and thermoelectric properties.

== Thermoelectric figure of merit ==
The usefulness of a material in thermoelectric systems is determined by the device efficiency. This is determined by the material's electrical conductivity (σ), thermal conductivity (κ), and Seebeck coefficient (S), which change with temperature (T). The maximum efficiency of the energy conversion process (for both power generation and cooling) at a given temperature point in the material is determined by the thermoelectric materials figure of merit $zT$, given by
$$zT = {\sigma S^2 T \over \kappa}.$$

=== Device efficiency ===
The efficiency of a thermoelectric device for electricity generation is given by $\eta$, defined as
$$\eta = {\text{energy provided  to  the  load} \over \text{heat  energy  absorbed  at  hot  junction}}.$$

The maximum efficiency of a thermoelectric device is typically described in terms of its device figure of merit $ZT$ where the maximum device efficiency is approximately given by
$$\eta_\mathrm{max} = {T_{\rm H} - T_{\rm C} \over T_{\rm H}} {\sqrt{1+Z\bar{T}}-1 \over \sqrt{1+Z\bar{T}} + {T_{\rm C} \over T_{\rm H}}},$$
where $T_{\rm H}$ and $T_{\rm C}$ are the absolute temperatures of the hot and cold junctions, respectively, and $\bar{T}$ is their mean temperature. For power generation, the temperature difference drives an electrical current through an external load. In thermoelectric cooling, electrical power is supplied to transfer heat from the cold side to the hot side.

For a single thermoelectric leg the device efficiency can be calculated from the temperature dependent properties S, κ and σ and the heat and electric current flow through the material. In an actual thermoelectric device, two materials are used (typically one n-type and one p-type) with metal interconnects. The maximum efficiency $\eta_\mathrm{max}$ is then calculated from the efficiency of both legs and the electrical and thermal losses from the interconnects and surroundings.

Ignoring these losses and temperature dependencies in S, κ and σ, an inexact estimate for $ZT$ is given by
$$Z\bar{T} = {(S_p - S_n)^2 \bar{T} \over [(\rho_n \kappa_n)^{1/2} + (\rho_p \kappa_p)^{1/2}]^2}$$
where $\rho$ is the electrical resistivity, and the properties are averaged over the temperature range; the subscripts n and p denote properties related to the n- and p-type semiconducting thermoelectric materials, respectively. Only when n and p elements have the same and temperature independent properties ($S_p = -S_n$) does $Z\bar{T} = z\bar{T}$.

Since thermoelectric devices are heat engines, their efficiency is limited by the Carnot efficiency $\frac{T_{\rm H} - T_{\rm C}}{T_{\rm H}}$, the first factor in $\eta_\mathrm{max}$, while $ZT$ and $zT$ determines the maximum reversibility of the thermodynamic process globally and locally, respectively. The coefficient of performance (COP) of a thermoelectric refrigerator is defined as the cooling power divided by the electrical input power:

$$\mathrm{COP}_{cooling} = \frac{\dot{Q}_C}{P_{electrical}}$$

Thermoelectric refrigerators generally have lower coefficients of performance than conventional vapor-compression refrigeration systems under comparable operating conditions. However, their COP varies with the temperature difference between the hot and cold sides, the applied current, the thermal load, and the properties of the thermoelectric materials.

=== Power factor ===
Often the thermoelectric power factor is reported for a thermoelectric material, given by
$$\mathrm{Power~factor} = \sigma S^2 [W/m/K^2]$$
where S is the Seebeck coefficient, and σ is the electrical conductivity.

Although it is often claimed that TE devices with materials with a higher power factor are able to 'generate' more energy (move more heat or extract more energy from that temperature difference) this is only true for a thermoelectric device with fixed geometry and unlimited heat source and cooling. If the geometry of the device is optimally designed for the specific application, the thermoelectric materials will operate at their peak efficiency which is determined by their $zT$ not $\sigma S^2$.

=== Aspects of materials choice ===
For good efficiency, materials with high electrical conductivity, low thermal conductivity and high Seebeck coefficient are needed.

==== Electron state density: metals vs semiconductors ====
The band structure of semiconductors offers better thermoelectric effects than the band structure of metals.

The Fermi energy is below the conduction band causing the state density to be asymmetric around the Fermi energy. Therefore, the average electron energy of the conduction band is higher than the Fermi energy, making the system conducive for charge motion into a lower energy state. By contrast, the Fermi energy lies in the conduction band in metals. This makes the state density symmetric about the Fermi energy so that the average conduction electron energy is close to the Fermi energy, reducing the forces pushing for charge transport. Therefore, semiconductors are ideal thermoelectric materials.

==== Conductivity ====
In the efficiency equations above, thermal conductivity and electrical conductivity compete.

The thermal conductivity κ in crystalline solids has mainly two components:

κ = κ _{electron} + κ _{phonon}

According to the Wiedemann–Franz law, the higher the electrical conductivity, the higher κ _{electron} becomes. Thus in metals the ratio of thermal to electrical conductivity is about fixed, as the electron part dominates. In semiconductors, the phonon part is important and cannot be neglected. It reduces the efficiency. For good efficiency a low ratio of κ _{phonon} / κ _{electron} is desired.

Therefore, it is necessary to minimize κ _{phonon} and keep the electrical conductivity high. Thus semiconductors should be highly doped.

G. A. Slack proposed that in order to optimize the figure of merit, phonons, which are responsible for thermal conductivity must experience the material as a glass (experiencing a high degree of phonon scattering—lowering thermal conductivity) while electrons must experience it as a crystal (experiencing very little scattering—maintaining electrical conductivity): this concept is called phonon glass electron crystal. The figure of merit can be improved through the independent adjustment of these properties.

==== Quality factor ====
The maximum $Z\bar{T}$ of a material is given by the material's quality factor

$$B= \frac{2 k_{\rm B}^2 \hbar}{3 \pi} \frac{N_{\rm v} C_{\rm l}}{m_{\rm l}^*\Xi^2\kappa_{\rm L}} T$$

where $k_{\rm B}$ is the Boltzmann constant, $\hbar$ is the reduced Planck constant, $N_{\rm v}$ is the number of degenerated valleys for the band, $C_{\rm l}$ is the average longitudinal elastic moduli, $m_{\rm l}^*$ is the inertial effective mass, $\Xi$ is the deformation potential coefficient, $\kappa_{\rm L}$ is the lattice thermal conduction, and $T$ is temperature. The figure of merit, $Z\bar{T}$, depends on doping concentration and temperature of the material of interest.

The material quality factor $B$ is useful because it allows for an intrinsic comparison of possible efficiency between different materials. This relation shows that improving the electronic component $\frac{N_{\rm v}}{m_{\rm l}^*\Xi^2}$, which primarily affects the Seebeck coefficient, will increase the quality factor of a material. A large density of states can be created due to a large number of conducting bands ($N_{\rm v}$) or by flat bands giving a high band effective mass ($m_{\rm b}^*$). For isotropic materials $m_{\rm b}^*= m_{\rm l}^*$. Therefore, it is desirable for thermoelectric materials to have high valley degeneracy in a very sharp band structure. Other complex features of the electronic structure are important. These can be partially quantified using an electronic fitness function.

== Materials of interest ==
Strategies to improve thermoelectric performances include both advanced bulk materials and the use of low-dimensional systems. Such approaches to reduce lattice thermal conductivity fall under three general material types: (1) Alloys: create point defects, vacancies, or rattling structures (heavy-ion species with large vibrational amplitudes contained within partially filled structural sites) to scatter phonons within the unit cell crystal; (2) Complex crystals: separate the phonon glass from the electron crystal using approaches similar to those for superconductors (the region responsible for electron transport should be an electron crystal of a high-mobility semiconductor, while the phonon glass should ideally house disordered structures and dopants without disrupting the electron crystal, analogous to the charge reservoir in high-T_{c} superconductors); (3) Multiphase nanocomposites: scatter phonons at the interfaces of nanostructured materials, be they mixed composites or thin film superlattices.

Materials under consideration for thermoelectric device applications include:

=== Bismuth chalcogenides and their nanostructures ===
Materials such as Bi_{2}Te_{3} and Bi_{2}Se_{3} comprise some of the best performing room temperature thermoelectrics with a temperature-independent figure-of-merit, ZT, between 0.8 and 1.0. Nanostructuring these materials to produce a layered superlattice structure of alternating Bi_{2}Te_{3} and Sb_{2}Te_{3} layers produces a device within which there is good electrical conductivity but perpendicular to which thermal conductivity is poor. The result is an enhanced ZT (approximately 2.4 at room temperature for p-type). Note that this high value of ZT has not been independently confirmed due to the complicated demands on the growth of such superlattices and device fabrication; however the material ZT values are consistent with the performance of hot-spot coolers made out of these materials and validated at Intel Labs.

Bismuth telluride and its solid solutions are good thermoelectric materials at room temperature and therefore suitable for refrigeration applications around 300 K. The Czochralski method has been used to grow single crystalline bismuth telluride compounds. These compounds are usually obtained with directional solidification from melt or powder metallurgy processes. Materials produced with these methods have lower efficiency than single crystalline ones due to the random orientation of crystal grains, but their mechanical properties are superior and the sensitivity to structural defects and impurities is lower due to high optimal carrier concentration.

The required carrier concentration is obtained by choosing a nonstoichiometric composition, which is achieved by introducing excess bismuth or tellurium atoms to primary melt or by dopant impurities. Some possible dopants are halogens and group IV and V atoms. Due to the small bandgap (0.16 eV) Bi_{2}Te_{3} is partially degenerate and the corresponding Fermi-level should be close to the conduction band minimum at room temperature. The size of the band-gap means that Bi_{2}Te_{3} has high intrinsic carrier concentration. Therefore, minority carrier conduction cannot be neglected for small stoichiometric deviations. Use of telluride compounds is limited by the toxicity and rarity of tellurium.

=== Lead tellurides ===
Heremans et al. (2008) demonstrated that thallium-doped lead telluride alloy (PbTe) achieves a ZT of 1.5 at 773 K. Later, Snyder et al. (2011) reported ZT~1.4 at 750 K in sodium-doped PbTe, and ZT~1.8 at 850 K in sodium-doped PbTe_{1−x}Se_{x} alloy. Snyder's group determined that both thallium and sodium alter the electronic structure of the crystal increasing electronic conductivity. They also claim that selenium increases electric conductivity and reduces thermal conductivity.

In 2012 another team used lead telluride to convert waste heat to electricity, reaching a ZT of 2.2, which they claimed was the highest yet reported.

=== Inorganic clathrates ===
Inorganic clathrates have the general formula A_{x}B_{y}C_{46-y} (type I) and A_{x}B_{y}C_{136-y} (type II), where B and C are group III and IV elements, respectively, which form the framework where "guest" A atoms (alkali or alkaline earth metal) are encapsulated in two different polyhedra facing each other. The differences between types I and II come from the number and size of voids present in their unit cells. Transport properties depend on the framework's properties, but tuning is possible by changing the "guest" atoms.

The most direct approach to synthesize and optimize the thermoelectric properties of semiconducting type I clathrates is substitutional doping, where some framework atoms are replaced with dopant atoms. In addition, powder metallurgical and crystal growth techniques have been used in clathrate synthesis. The structural and chemical properties of clathrates enable the optimization of their transport properties as a function of stoichiometry. The structure of type II materials allows a partial filling of the polyhedra, enabling better tuning of the electrical properties and therefore better control of the doping level. Partially filled variants can be synthesized as semiconducting or even insulating.

Blake et al. have predicted ZT~0.5 at room temperature and ZT~1.7 at 800 K for optimized compositions. Kuznetsov et al. measured electrical resistance and Seebeck coefficient for three different type I clathrates above room temperature and by estimating high temperature thermal conductivity from the published low temperature data they obtained ZT~0.7 at 700 K for Ba_{8}Ga_{16}Ge_{30} and ZT~0.87 at 870 K for Ba_{8}Ga_{16}Si_{30}.

=== Compounds of Mg and group-14 element ===
Mg_{2}B^{IV} (B^{14}=Si, Ge, Sn) compounds and their solid solutions are good thermoelectric materials and their ZT values are comparable with those of established materials. The appropriate production methods are based on direct co-melting, but mechanical alloying has also been used. During synthesis, magnesium losses due to evaporation and segregation of components (especially for Mg_{2}Sn) need to be taken into account. Directed crystallization methods can produce single crystals of Mg_{2}Si, but they intrinsically have n-type conductivity, and doping, e.g. with Sn, Ga, Ag or Li, is required to produce p-type material which is required for an efficient thermoelectric device. Solid solutions and doped compounds have to be annealed in order to produce homogeneous samples – with the same properties throughout. At 800 K, Mg_{2}Si_{0.55−x}Sn_{0.4}Ge_{0.05}Bi_{x} has been reported to have a figure of merit about 1.4, the highest ever reported for these compounds.

=== Skutterudite thermoelectrics ===
Skutterudites have a chemical composition of LM_{4}X_{12}, where L is a rare-earth metal (optional component), M is a transition metal, and X is a metalloid, a group V element or a pnictogen such as phosphorus, antimony, or arsenic. These materials exhibit ZT>1.0 and can potentially be used in multistage thermoelectric devices.

Unfilled, these materials contain voids, which can be filled with low-coordination ions (usually rare-earth elements) to reduce thermal conductivity by producing sources for lattice phonon scattering, without reducing electrical conductivity. It is also possible to reduce the thermal conductivity in skutterudite without filling these voids using a special architecture containing nano- and micro-pores.

NASA is developing a Multi-Mission Radioisotope Thermoelectric Generator in which the thermocouples would be made of skutterudite, which can function with a smaller temperature difference than the current tellurium designs. This would mean that an otherwise similar RTG would generate 25% more power at the beginning of a mission and at least 50% more after seventeen years. NASA hopes to use the design on the next New Frontiers mission.

=== Oxide thermoelectrics ===
Homologous oxide compounds (such as those of the form (SrTiO_{3})_{n}(SrO)_{m}—the Ruddlesden-Popper phase) have layered superlattice structures that make them promising candidates for use in high-temperature thermoelectric devices. These materials exhibit low thermal conductivity perpendicular to the layers while maintaining good electronic conductivity within the layers. Their ZT values can reach 2.4 for epitaxial SrTiO_{3} films, and the enhanced thermal stability of such oxides, as compared to conventional high-ZT bismuth compounds, makes them superior high-temperature thermoelectrics.

Interest in oxides as thermoelectric materials was reawakened in 1997 when a relatively high thermoelectric power was reported for NaCo_{2}O_{4}. In addition to their thermal stability, other advantages of oxides are their low toxicity and high oxidation resistance. Simultaneously controlling both the electric and phonon systems may require nanostructured materials. Layered Ca_{3}Co_{4}O_{9} exhibited ZT values of 1.4–2.7 at 900 K. If the layers in a given material have the same stoichiometry, they will be stacked so that the same atoms will not be positioned on top of each other, impeding phonon conductivity perpendicular to the layers. Recently, oxide thermoelectrics have gained a lot of attention so that the range of promising phases increased drastically. Novel members of this family include ZnO, MnO_{2}, and NbO_{2}.

=== Cation-substituted copper sulfide thermoelectrics ===
All variables mentioned are included in the equation for the dimensionless figure of merit, zT, which can be seen at the top of this page. The goal of any thermoelectric experiment is to make the power factor, S^{2} σ, larger while maintaining a small thermal conductivity. This is because electricity is produced through a temperature gradient, so materials that can equilibrate heat very quickly are not useful. The two compounds detailed below were found to exhibit high-performing thermoelectric properties, which can be evidenced by the reported figure of merit in either respective manuscript.

Cuprokalininite (CuCr_{2}S_{4}) is a copper-dominant analogue of the mineral joegoldsteinite. It was recently found within metamorphic rocks in Slyudyanka, part of the South Baikal region of Russia, and researchers have determined that Sb-doped cuprokalininite (Cu_{1-x}Sb_{x}Cr_{2}S_{4}) shows promise in renewable technology. Doping is the act of intentionally adding an impurity, usually to modify the electrochemical characteristics of the seed material. The introduction of antimony enhances the power factor by bringing in extra electrons, which increases the Seebeck coefficient, S, and reduces the magnetic moment (how likely the particles are to align with a magnetic field); it also distorts the crystal structure, which lowers the thermal conductivity, κ. Khan et al. (2017) were able to discover the optimal amount of Sb content (x=0.3) in cuprokalininte in order to develop a device with a ZT value of 0.43.

Bornite (Cu_{5}FeS_{4}) is a sulfide mineral named after an Austrian mineralogist, though it is much more common than the aforementioned cuprokalininite. This metal ore was found to demonstrate an improved thermoelectric performance after undergoing cation exchange with iron. Cation exchange is the process of surrounding a parent crystal with an electrolyte complex, so that the cations (positively charged ions) within the structure can be swapped out for those in solution without affecting the anion sublattice (negatively charged crystal network). What one is left with are crystals that possess a different composition, yet an identical framework. In this way, scientists are granted extreme morphological control and uniformity when generating complicated heterostructures. As to why it was thought to improve the ZT value, the mechanics of cation exchange often bring about crystallographic defects, which cause phonons (simply put, heat particles) to scatter. According to the Debye-Callaway formalism, a model used to determine the lattice thermal conductivity, κ_{L}, the highly anharmonic behavior due to phonon scattering results in a large thermal resistance. Therefore, a greater defect density decreases the lattice thermal conductivity, thereby making a larger figure of merit. In conclusion, Long et al. reported that greater Cu-deficiencies resulted in increases of up to 88% in the ZT value, with a maximum of 0.79.

The composition of thermoelectric devices can dramatically vary depending on the temperature of the heat they must harvest; considering the fact that more than eighty percent of industry waste falls within a range of 373-575 K, chalcogenides and antimonides are better suited for thermoelectric conversion because they can utilize heat at lower temperatures. Not only is sulfur the cheapest and lightest chalcogenide, current surpluses may be causing threat to the environment since it is a byproduct of oil capture, so sulfur consumption could help mitigate future damage. As for the metal, copper is an ideal seed particle for any kind of substitution method because of its high mobility and variable oxidation state, for it can balance or complement the charge of more inflexible cations. Therefore, either the cuprokalininite or bornite minerals could prove ideal thermoelectric components.

=== Half-Heusler alloys ===
Half-Heusler (HH) alloys have a great potential for high-temperature power generation applications. Examples of these alloys include NbFeSb, NbCoSn and VFeSb. They have a cubic MgAgAs-type structure formed by three interpenetrating face-centered-cubic (fcc) lattices. The ability to substitute any of these three sublattices opens the door for wide variety of compounds to be synthesized. Various atomic substitutions are employed to reduce the thermal conductivity and enhance the electrical conductivity.

Previously, ZT could not peak more than 0.5 for p-type and 0.8 for n-type HH compound. However, in the past few years, researchers were able to achieve ZT≈1 for both n-type and p-type. Nano-sized grains is one of the approaches used to lower the thermal conductivity via grain boundaries- assisted phonon scattering. Another approach was to utilize the principles of nanocomposites, by which certain combination of metals were favored on others due to the atomic size difference. For instance, Hf and Ti is more effective than Hf and Zr, when reduction of thermal conductivity is of concern, since the atomic size difference between the former is larger than that of the latter.

=== Flexible Thermoelectric Materials ===
==== Electrically conducting organic materials ====
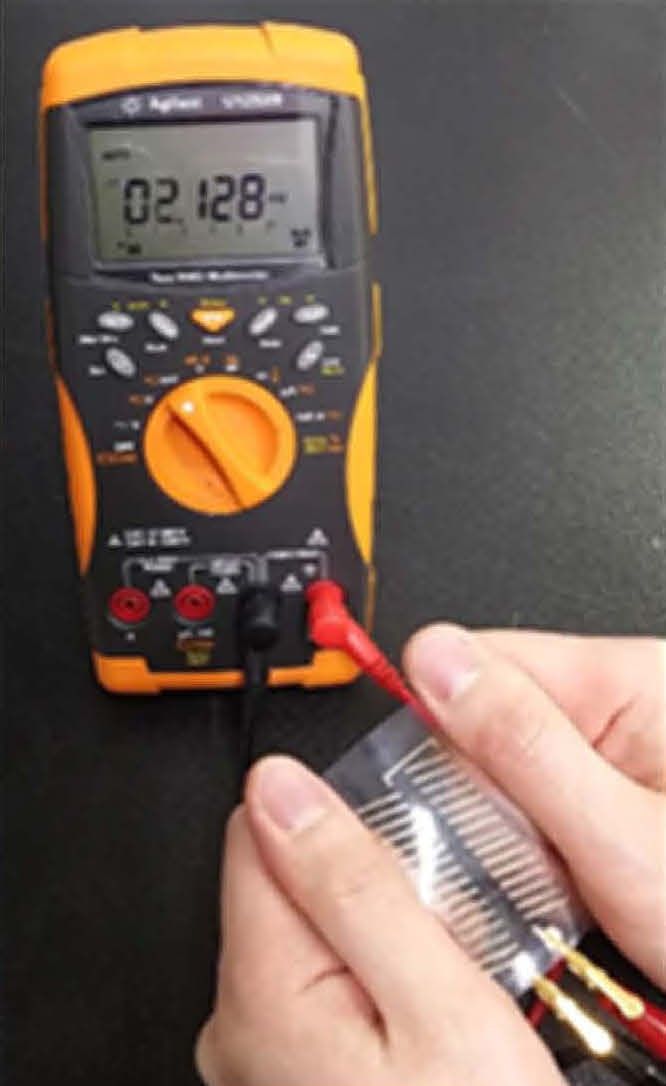
Generation of electricity by grabbing both sides of a flexible PEDOT:PSS thermoelectric device

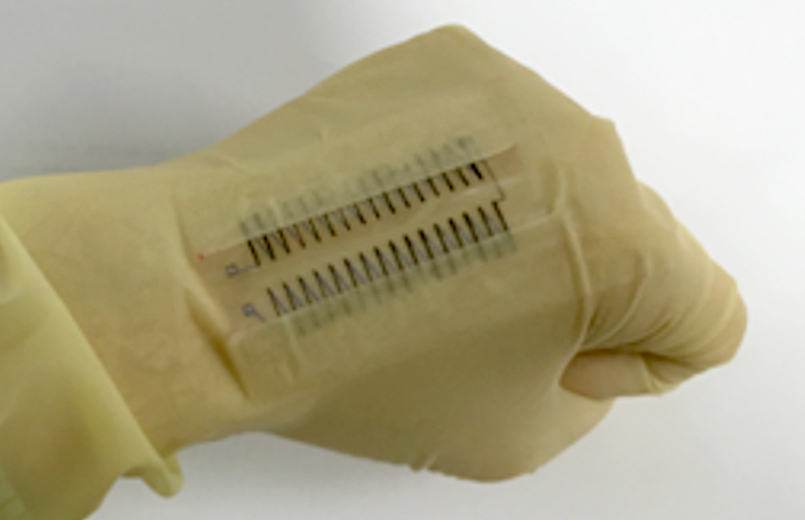
PEDOT:PSS-based model embedded into a glove to generate electricity by body heat

Conducting polymers are of significant interest for flexible thermoelectric development. They are flexible, lightweight, geometrically versatile, and can be processed at scale, an important component for commercialization. However, the structural disorder of these materials often inhibits the electrical conductivity much more than the thermal conductivity, limiting their use so far. Some of the most common conducting polymers investigated for flexible thermoelectrics include poly(3,4-ethylenedioxythiophene) (PEDOT), polyanilines (PANIs), polythiophenes, polyacetylenes, polypyrrole, and polycarbazole. P-type PEDOT:PSS (polystyrene sulfonate) and PEDOT-Tos (Tosylate) have been some of the most encouraging materials investigated. Organic, air-stable n-type thermoelectrics are often harder to synthesize because of their low electron affinity and likelihood of reacting with oxygen and water in the air. These materials often have a figure of merit that is still too low for commercial applications (~0.42 in PEDOT:PSS) due to the poor electrical conductivity.

==== Hybrid Composites ====
Hybrid composite thermoelectrics involve blending the previously discussed electrically conducting organic materials or other composite materials with other conductive materials in an effort to improve transport properties. The conductive materials that are most commonly added include carbon nanotubes and graphene due to their conductivities and mechanical properties. It has been shown that carbon nanotubes can increase the tensile strength of the polymer composite they are blended with. However, they can also reduce the flexibility. Furthermore, future study into the orientation and alignment of these added materials will allow for improved performance. The percolation threshold of CNT's is often especially low, well below 10%, due to their high aspect ratio. A low percolation threshold is desirable for both cost and flexibility purposes. Reduced graphene oxide (rGO) as graphene-related material was also used to enhance figure of merit of thermoelectric materials. The addition of rather low amount of graphene or rGO around 1 wt% mainly strengthens the phonon scattering at grain boundaries of all these materials as well as increases the charge carrier concentration and mobility in chalcogenide-, skutterudite- and, particularly, metal oxide-based composites. However, significant growth of ZT after addition of graphene or rGO was observed mainly for composites based on thermoelectric materials with low initial ZT. When thermoelectric material is already nanostructured and possesses high electrical conductivity, such an addition does not enhance ZT significantly. Thus, graphene or rGO-additive works mainly as an optimizer of the intrinsic performance of thermoelectric materials.

Hybrid thermoelectric composites also refer to polymer-inorganic thermoelectric composites. This is generally achieved through an inert polymer matrix that is host to thermoelectric filler material. The matrix is generally nonconductive so as to not short current as well as to let the thermoelectric material dominate electrical transport properties. One major benefit of this method is that the polymer matrix will generally be highly disordered and random on many different length scales, meaning that the composite material will can have a much lower thermal conductivity. The general procedure to synthesize these materials involves a solvent to dissolve the polymer and dispersion of the thermoelectric material throughout the mixture.

=== Silicon-germanium alloys ===
Bulk Si exhibits a low ZT of ~0.01 because of its high thermal conductivity. However, ZT can be as high as 0.6 in silicon nanowires, which retain the high electrical conductivity of doped Si, but reduce the thermal conductivity due to elevated scattering of phonons on their extensive surfaces and low cross-section.

Combining Si and Ge also allows to retain a high electrical conductivity of both components and reduce the thermal conductivity. The reduction originates from additional scattering due to very different lattice (phonon) properties of Si and Ge. As a result, Silicon-germanium alloys are currently the best thermoelectric materials around 1000 °C and are therefore used in some radioisotope thermoelectric generators (RTG) (notably the MHW-RTG and GPHS-RTG) and some other high^temperature applications, such as waste heat recovery. Usability of silicon-germanium alloys is limited by their high price and moderate ZT values (p-SiGe ~0.7 and n-SiGe ~1.0); however, ZT can be increased to 1–2 in SiGe nanostructures owing to the reduction in thermal conductivity.

=== Sodium cobaltate ===
Experiments on crystals of sodium cobaltate, using X-ray and neutron scattering experiments carried out at the European Synchrotron Radiation Facility (ESRF) and the Institut Laue-Langevin (ILL) in Grenoble were able to suppress thermal conductivity by a factor of six compared to vacancy-free sodium cobaltate. The experiments agreed with corresponding density functional calculations. The technique involved large anharmonic displacements of Na_{0.8}CoO_{2} contained within the crystals.

=== Amorphous materials ===
In 2002, Nolas and Goldsmid have come up with a suggestion that systems with the phonon mean free path larger than the charge carrier mean free path can exhibit an enhanced thermoelectric efficiency. This can be realized in amorphous thermoelectrics and soon they became a focus of many studies. This ground-breaking idea was accomplished in Cu-Ge-Te, NbO_{2}, In-Ga-Zn-O, Zr-Ni-Sn, Si-Au, and Ti-Pb-V-O amorphous systems. It should be mentioned that modelling of transport properties is challenging enough without breaking the long-range order so that design of amorphous thermoelectrics is at its infancy. Naturally, amorphous thermoelectrics give rise to extensive phonon scattering, which is still a challenge for crystalline thermoelectrics. A bright future is expected for these materials.

=== Functionally graded materials ===
Functionally graded materials make it possible to improve the conversion efficiency of existing thermoelectrics. These materials have a non-uniform carrier concentration distribution and in some cases also solid solution composition. In power generation applications the temperature difference can be several hundred degrees and therefore devices made from homogeneous materials have some part that operates at the temperature where ZT is substantially lower than its maximum value. This problem can be solved by using materials whose transport properties vary along their length thus enabling substantial improvements to the operating efficiency over large temperature differences. This is possible with functionally graded materials as they have a variable carrier concentration along the length of the material, which is optimized for operations over specific temperature range.

=== Nanomaterials and superlattices ===
In addition to nanostructured Bi_{2}Te_{3}/Sb_{2}Te_{3} superlattice thin films, other nanostructured materials, including silicon nanowires, nanotubes and quantum dots show potential in improving thermoelectric properties.

==== PbTe/PbSeTe quantum dot superlattice ====
Another example of a superlattice involves a PbTe/PbSeTe quantum dot superlattices provides an enhanced ZT (approximately 1.5 at room temperature) that was higher than the bulk ZT value for either PbTe or PbSeTe (approximately 0.5).

==== Nanocrystal stability and thermal conductivity ====
Not all nanocrystalline materials are stable, because the crystal size can grow at high temperatures, ruining the materials' desired characteristics.

Nanocrystalline materials have many interfaces between crystals, which Physics of SASER scatter phonons so the thermal conductivity is reduced. Phonons are confined to the grain, if their mean free path is larger than the material grain size.

==== Nanocrystalline transition metal silicides ====
Nanocrystalline transition metal silicides are a promising material group for thermoelectric applications, because they fulfill several criteria that are demanded from the commercial applications point of view. In some nanocrystalline transition metal silicides the power factor is higher than in the corresponding polycrystalline material but the lack of reliable data on thermal conductivity prevents the evaluation of their thermoelectric efficiency.

==== Nanostructured skutterudites ====
Skutterudites, a cobalt arsenide mineral with variable amounts of nickel and iron, can be produced artificially, and are candidates for better thermoelectric materials.

One advantage of nanostructured skutterudites over normal skutterudites is their reduced thermal conductivity, caused by grain boundary scattering. ZT values of ~0.65 and > 0.4 have been achieved with CoSb_{3} based samples; the former values were 2.0 for Ni and 0.75 for Te-doped material at 680 K and latter for Au-composite at T > 700 K.

Even greater performance improvements can be achieved by using composites and by controlling the grain size, the compaction conditions of polycrystalline samples and the carrier concentration.

==== Graphene ====
Graphene is known for its high electrical conductivity and Seebeck coefficient at room temperature. However, from thermoelectric perspective, its thermal conductivity is notably high, which in turn limits its ZT. Several approaches were suggested to reduce the thermal conductivity of graphene without altering much its electrical conductivity. These include, but not limited to, the following:

- Doping with carbon isotopes to form isotopic heterojunction such as that of ^{12}C and ^{13}C. Those isotopes possess different phonon frequency mismatch, which leads to the scattering of the heat carriers (phonons). This approach has been shown to affect neither the power factor nor the electrical conductivity.
- Wrinkles and cracks in the graphene structure were shown to contribute to the reduction in the thermal conductivity. Reported values of thermal conductivity of suspended graphene of size 3.8 μm show a wide spread from 1500 to 5000 W/(m·K). A recent study attributed that to the microstructural defects present in graphene, such as wrinkles and cracks, which can drop the thermal conductivity by 27%. These defects help scatter phonons.
- Introduction of defects with techniques such as oxygen plasma treatment. A more systemic way of introducing defects in graphene structure is done through O_{2} plasma treatment. Ultimately, the graphene sample will contain prescribed-holes spaced and numbered according to the plasma intensity. People were able to improve ZT of graphene from 1 to a value of 2.6 when the defect density is raised from 0.04 to 2.5 (this number is an index of defect density and usually understood when compared to the corresponding value of the un-treated graphene, 0.04 in our case). Nevertheless, this technique would lower the electrical conductivity as well, which can be kept unchanged if the plasma processing parameters are optimized.
- Functionalization of graphene by oxygen. The thermal behavior of graphene oxide has not been investigated extensively as compared to its counterpart; graphene. However, it was shown theoretically by Density Functional Theory (DFT) model that adding oxygen into the lattice of graphene reduces a lot its thermal conductivity due to phonon scattering effect. Scattering of phonons result from both acoustic mismatch and reduced symmetry in graphene structure after doping with oxygen. The reduction of thermal conductivity can easily exceed 50% with this approach.

==== Superlattices and roughness ====
Superlattices – nano structured thermocouples, are considered a good candidate for better thermoelectric device manufacturing, with materials that can be used in manufacturing this structure.

Their production is expensive for general-use due to fabrication processes based on expensive thin-film growth methods. However, since the amount of thin-film materials required for device fabrication with superlattices, is so much less than thin-film materials in bulk thermoelectric materials (almost by a factor of 1/10,000) the long-term cost advantage is indeed favorable.

This is particularly true given the limited availability of tellurium causing competing solar applications for thermoelectric coupling systems to rise.

Superlattice structures also allow the independent manipulation of transport parameters by adjusting the structure itself, enabling research for better understanding of the thermoelectric phenomena in nanoscale, and studying the phonon-blocking electron-transmitting structures – explaining the changes in electric field and conductivity due to the material's nano-structure.

Many strategies exist to decrease the superlattice thermal conductivity that are based on engineering of phonon transport. The thermal conductivity along the film plane and wire axis can be reduced by creating diffuse interface scattering and by reducing the interface separation distance, both which are caused by interface roughness.

Interface roughness can naturally occur or may be artificially induced. In nature, roughness is caused by the mixing of atoms of foreign elements. Artificial roughness can be created using various structure types, such as quantum dot interfaces and thin-films on step-covered substrates.

===== Problems in superlattices =====
Reduced electrical conductivity:
Reduced phonon-scattering interface structures often also exhibit a decrease in electrical conductivity.

The thermal conductivity in the cross-plane direction of the lattice is usually very low, but depending on the type of superlattice, the thermoelectric coefficient may increase because of changes to the band structure.

Low thermal conductivity in superlattices is usually due to strong interface scattering of phonons. Minibands are caused by the lack of quantum confinement within a well. The mini-band structure depends on the superlattice period so that with a very short period (~1 nm) the band structure approaches the alloy limit and with a long period (≥ ~60 nm) minibands become so close to each other that they can be approximated with a continuum.

Superlattice structure countermeasures:
Counter measures can be taken which practically eliminate the problem of decreased electrical conductivity in a reduced phonon-scattering interface. These measures include the proper choice of superlattice structure, taking advantage of mini-band conduction across superlattices, and avoiding quantum-confinement. It has been shown that because electrons and phonons have different wavelengths, it is possible to engineer the structure in such a way that phonons are scattered more diffusely at the interface than electrons.

Phonon confinement countermeasures:
Another approach to overcome the decrease in electrical conductivity in reduced phonon-scattering structures is to increase phonon reflectivity and therefore decrease the thermal conductivity perpendicular to the interfaces.

This can be achieved by increasing the mismatch between the materials in adjacent layers, including density, group velocity, specific heat, and the phonon-spectrum.

Interface roughness causes diffuse phonon scattering, which either increases or decreases the phonon reflectivity at the interfaces. A mismatch between bulk dispersion relations confines phonons, and the confinement becomes more favorable as the difference in dispersion increases.

The amount of confinement is currently unknown as only some models and experimental data exist. As with a previous method, the effects on the electrical conductivity have to be considered.

Attempts to localize long-wavelength phonons by aperiodic superlattices or composite superlattices with different periodicities have been made. In addition, defects, especially dislocations, can be used to reduce thermal conductivity in low dimensional systems.

Parasitic heat:
Parasitic heat conduction in the barrier layers could cause significant performance loss. It has been proposed but not tested that this can be overcome by choosing a certain correct distance between the quantum wells.

The Seebeck coefficient can change its sign in superlattice nanowires due to the existence of minigaps as Fermi energy varies. This indicates that superlattices can be tailored to exhibit n or p-type behavior by using the same dopants as those that are used for corresponding bulk materials by carefully controlling Fermi energy or the dopant concentration. With nanowire arrays, it is possible to exploit semimetal-semiconductor transition due to the quantum confinement and use materials that normally would not be good thermoelectric materials in bulk form. Such elements are for example bismuth. The Seebeck effect could also be used to determine the carrier concentration and Fermi energy in nanowires.

In quantum dot thermoelectrics, unconventional or nonband transport behavior (e.g. tunneling or hopping) is necessary to utilize their special electronic band structure in the transport direction. It is possible to achieve ZT>2 at elevated temperatures with quantum dot superlattices, but they are almost always unsuitable for mass production.

However, in superlattices, where quantum-effects are not involved, with film thickness of only a few micrometers (μm) to about 15 μm, Bi_{2}Te_{3}/Sb_{2}Te_{3} superlattice material has been made into high-performance microcoolers and other devices. The performance of hot-spot coolers are consistent with the reported ZT~2.4 of superlattice materials at 300 K.

Nanocomposites are promising material class for bulk thermoelectric devices, but several challenges have to be overcome to make them suitable for practical applications. It is not well understood why the improved thermoelectric properties appear only in certain materials with specific fabrication processes.

SrTe nanocrystals can be embedded in a bulk PbTe matrix so that rocksalt lattices of both materials are completely aligned (endotaxy) with optimal molar concentration for SrTe only 2%. This can cause strong phonon scattering but would not affect charge transport. In such case, ZT~1.7 can be achieved at 815 K for p-type material.

=== Tin selenide ===
In 2014, researchers at Northwestern University discovered that tin selenide (SnSe) has a ZT of 2.6 along the b axis of the unit cell. This was the highest value reported to date. This was attributed to an extremely low thermal conductivity found in the SnSe lattice. Specifically, SnSe demonstrated a lattice thermal conductivity of 0.23 W·m^{−1}·K^{−1}, much lower than previously reported values of 0.5 W·m^{−1}·K^{−1} and greater. This material also exhibited a ZT of 2.3±0.3 along the c-axis and 0.8±0.2 along the a-axis. These results were obtained at a temperature of 923 K (650 °C). As shown by the figures below, SnSe performance metrics were found to significantly improve at higher temperatures; this is due to a structural change. Power factor, conductivity, and thermal conductivity all reach their optimal values at or above 750 K, and appear to plateau at higher temperatures. However, other groups have not been able to reproduce the reported bulk thermal conductivity data.

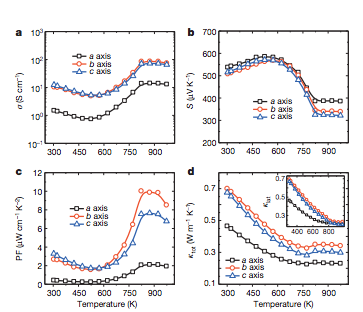
SnSe performance metrics

Although it exists at room temperature in an orthorhombic structure with space group Pnma, SnSe undergoes a transition to a structure with higher symmetry, space group Cmcm, at higher temperatures. This structure consists of Sn-Se planes that are stacked upwards in the a-direction, which accounts for the poor performance out-of-plane (along a-axis). Upon transitioning to the Cmcm structure, SnSe maintains its low thermal conductivity but exhibits higher carrier mobilities.

One impediment to further development of SnSe is that it has a relatively low carrier concentration: approximately 10^{17} cm^{−3}. Compounding this issue is the fact that SnSe has been reported to have low doping efficiency.

However, such single crystalline materials suffer from inability to make useful devices due to their brittleness as well as narrow range of temperatures, where ZT is reported to be high.

In 2021 the researchers announced a polycrystalline form of SnSe that was at once less brittle and featured a ZT of 3.1.

=== Anderson localization ===
Anderson localization is a quantum mechanical phenomenom where charge carriers in a random potential are trapped in place (i.e. they are in localized states as opposed to being in scattering states if they could move freely). This localization prevents the charge carriers from moving, which inhibits their contribution to the thermal conductivity of a material, but because it also lowers the electrical conductivity, it was thought to reduce ZT and be detrimental for thermoelectric materials. In 2019, it was proposed that by localizing only the minority charge carriers in a doped semiconductor (i.e. holes in an n-doped semiconductor or electrons in a p-doped semiconductor), Anderson localization could increase ZT. The heat conductivity associated with movement of the minority charge carriers would be reduced while electrical conductivity of the majority charge carrier would be unaffected.

In 2020, researchers at Kyung Hee University demonstrated the use of Anderson localization in an n-type semiconductor to improve the thermoelectric properties of a material. They embedded nanoparticles of silver telluride (Ag_{2}Te) in a lead telluride (PbTe) matrix. Ag_{2}Te undergoes a phase transition around 407 K. Below this temperature, both holes and electrons are localized at the Ag_{2}Te nanoparticles, while after the transition, holes are still localized, but electrons can move freely in the material. The researchers were able to increase ZT from 1.5 to above 2.0 using this method.

== Production methods ==
Production methods for these materials can be divided into powder and crystal growth based techniques. Powder based techniques offer excellent ability to control and maintain desired carrier distribution, particle size, and composition. In crystal growth techniques dopants are often mixed with melt, but diffusion from gaseous phase can also be used. In the zone melting techniques disks of different materials are stacked on top of others and then materials are mixed with each other when a traveling heater causes melting. In powder techniques, either different powders are mixed with a varying ratio before melting or they are in different layers as a stack before pressing and melting.

There are applications, such as cooling of electronic circuits, where thin films are required. Therefore, thermoelectric materials can also be synthesized using physical vapor deposition techniques. Another reason to utilize these methods is to design these phases and provide guidance for bulk applications.

=== 3D Printing ===
Significant improvement on 3D printing skills has made it possible for thermoelectric components to be prepared via 3D printing. Thermoelectric products are made from special materials that absorb heat and create electricity. The requirement of fitting complex geometries in tightly constrained spaces makes 3D printing the ideal manufacturing technique. There are several benefits to the use of additive manufacturing in thermoelectric material production. Additive manufacturing allows for innovation in the design of these materials, facilitating intricate geometries that would not otherwise be possible by conventional manufacturing processes. It reduces the amount of wasted material during production and allows for faster production turnaround times by eliminating the need for tooling and prototype fabrication, which can be time-consuming and expensive.

There are several major additive manufacturing technologies that have emerged as feasible methods for the production of thermoelectric materials, including continuous inkjet printing, dispenser printing, screen printing, stereolithography, and selective laser sintering. Each method has its own challenges and limitations, especially related to the material class and form that can be used. For example, selective laser sintering (SLS) can be used with metal and ceramic powders, stereolithography (SLA) must be used with curable resins containing solid particle dispersions of the thermoelectric material of choice, and inkjet printing must use inks which are usually synthesized by dispersing inorganic powders to organic solvent or making a suspension.

The motivation for producing thermoelectrics by means of additive manufacturing is due to a desire to improve the properties of these materials, namely increasing their thermoelectric figure of merit ZT, and thereby improving their energy conversion efficiency. Research has been done proving the efficacy and investigating the material properties of thermoelectric materials produced via additive manufacturing. An extrusion-based additive manufacturing method was used to successfully print bismuth telluride (Bi_{2}Te_{3}) with various geometries. This method utilized an all-inorganic viscoelastic ink synthesized using Sb_{2}Te_{2} chalcogenidometallate ions as binders for Bi_{2}Te_{3}-based particles. The results of this method showed homogenous thermoelectric properties throughout the material and a thermoelectric figure of merit ZT of 0.9 for p-type samples and 0.6 for n-type samples. The Seebeck coefficient of this material was also found to increase with increasing temperature up to around 200 °C.

Groundbreaking research has also been done towards the use of selective laser sintering (SLS) for the production of thermoelectric materials. Loose Bi_{2}Te_{3} powders have been printed via SLS without the use of pre- or post-processing of the material, pre-forming of a substrate, or use of binder materials. The printed samples achieved 88% relative density (compared to a relative density of 92% in conventionally manufactured Bi_{2}Te_{3}). Scanning Electron Microscopy (SEM) imaging results showed adequate fusion between layers of deposited materials. Though pores existed within the melted region, this is a general existing issue with parts made by SLS, occurring as a result of gas bubbles that get trapped in the melted material during its rapid solidification. X-ray diffraction results showed that the crystal structure of the material was intact after laser melting.

The Seebeck coefficient, figure of merit ZT, electrical and thermal conductivity, specific heat, and thermal diffusivity of the samples were also investigated, at high temperatures up to 500 °C. Of particular interest is the ZT of these Bi_{2}Te_{3} samples, which were found to decrease with increasing temperatures up to around 300 °C, increase slightly at temperatures between 300-400 °C, and then increase sharply without further increase in temperature. The highest achieved ZT value (for an n-type sample) was about 0.11.

The bulk thermoelectric material properties of samples produced using SLS had comparable thermoelectric and electrical properties to thermoelectric materials produced using conventional manufacturing methods. This the first time the SLS method of thermoelectric material production has been used successfully.

== Mechanical Properties ==
Thermoelectric materials are commonly used in thermoelectric generators to convert the thermal energy into electricity. Thermoelectric generators convert temperature differences directly into electrical energy through the Seebeck effect. Unlike conventional mechanical heat engines, thermoelectric generators have no moving parts. However, the mechanical reliability of thermoelectric devices may be affected by repeated thermal cycling, thermal expansion mismatch, fatigue, and creep deformation, particularly at interfaces between thermoelectric elements and their electrical interconnections.

=== Thermomechanical Stresses in Thermoelectric Devices ===
==== Geometrical Effects ====
In their research, Al-Merbati et al. found that the stress levels around the leg corners of thermoelectric devices were high and generally increased closer to the hot side. However, switching to a trapezoidal leg geometry reduced thermal stresses. Erturun et al. compared various leg geometries and discovered that rectangular prism and cylindrical legs experienced the highest stresses. Studies have also shown that using thinner and longer legs can significantly relieve stress. Tachibana and Fang estimated the relationship between thermal stress, temperature difference, coefficient of thermal expansion, and module dimensions. They found that the thermal stress was proportional to$\left(L \cdot \alpha \cdot \frac{\Delta T}{h}\right)^2$, where $L$, $\alpha$, $\Delta T$ and $h$ are module thickness, Coefficients of Thermal Expansion(CTE), temperature difference and leg height, respectively.

==== Effect of Boundary Conditions ====
Clin et al. conducted finite-element analysis to replicate thermal stresses in a thermoelectric module and concluded that the thermal stresses were dependent on the mechanical boundary conditions on the module and on CTE mismatch between various components. The corners of the legs exhibited maximum stresses. In a separate investigation, Turenne et al. examined the distribution of stress in large freestanding thermoelectric modules and those rigidly fixed between two surfaces for thermal exchange. Although boundary conditions significantly altered the stress distribution, the authors deduced that external compressive loading on the TE module resulted in the creation of global compressive stresses.

==== Effect of Thermal Fatigue ====
Thermoelectric materials commonly contain different types of defects, such as dislocations, vacancies, secondary phases and antisite defects. These defects can affect thermoelectric performance by evolving under service conditions. In 2019, Yun Zheng et al. studied thermal fatigue of $\ce{Bi_2Te_3}$-based materials and they proposed that their fatigue behavior can be reduced via boosting the fracture toughness by introducing pores, microcracks or inclusion with the inextricable trade-off with fracture strength.

==== Effect of Thermal Shocks ====
Thermoelectric materials can undergo thermal shock loading through service temperature spikes, soldering and metallizing processes. The thermoelectric leg can be coated with metals to form the required diffusion barrier (Metallizing) and dipping the metallized leg in a molten alloy bath (Soldering) for connecting the leg to the interconnect. In a study conducted by Pelletier et al. thermoelectric disks were quenched for the purpose of thermal shock experiments. They realized that quenching in a hot medium helped disks' surface to produce compressive stresses in contrary to the core, which developed tensile stress. Anisotropic materials and thin disks were reported to develop greater maximum stresses. They also observed fracturing of specimens during quenching process in a soldering bath from room temperature.

==== Effects of Tensile Stresses ====
Thermal stresses have been quantified and extensively studied in thermoelectric modules throughout the years but von Mises stresses are commonly reported. The von Mises stress defines a constraint on plastic yielding without having any information of the stress nature.

For instance, in a study by Sakamoto et al. the mechanical stability of a $\ce{Mg_2Si}$-based structure was investigated that could utilize thermoelectric legs at an angle with electrical interconnects and substrates. Maximum tensile strength stresses were calculated and compared to the ultimate tensile strength of different materials. This approach might be misleading for brittle materials (such as ceramics) as they do not possess a defined tensile strength.

==== Thermal Mismatch Stresses ====
In 2018, Chen et al. investigated the cracking failure of Cu pillar bump that was caused by electromigration under thermoelectric coupling load. They showed that under thermoelectric coupling load, will experience severe joule heat and current density that can be accumulate thermoemechanical stress and miscrostructure evolution. They also pointed out that the difference in CTE between materials in the flip chip package causes thermal mismatch stress which can later develop the cavities to expand along cathode into cracks. Also, it is worth noting that they mentioned thermal-electrical coupling can cause electromigration, microcracks and delamination due to temperature and stress concentration that can fail Cu pillar bumps.

==== Phase-Transformation Stresses ====
Phase transformation can occur in thermoelectric materials as well as many other energy materials. As pointed out by Al Malki et al., phase transformation can lead to a total plastic strain when internal mismatch stresses are biased with shear stress. The alpha phase of $\ce{Ag_2S}$ transforms to a body centered cubic phase. Liang et al. showed that a crack was observed when heating through 407 K through this phase transformation.

==== Creep Deformation ====
Creep deformation is a time-dependent mechanism where strain accumulates as amaterial is subjected to external or internal stressesat a high homologous temperature in excess of T/Tm= 0.5(whereTmis the melting point in K). This phenomenon can emerge in thermoelectric devices after operating for a long time (i.e. months to years). A coarse-grained or monocrystalline structures have been shown to be desirable as creep-resistant materials.

== Applications ==
=== Refrigeration ===
Thermoelectric materials are used in solid-state cooling devices known as thermoelectric coolers (TECs) or Peltier coolers. These devices utilize the Peltier effect to transfer heat from one side of the device to the other when an electric current is applied. As a cooling technology, Peltier cooling is far less common than vapor-compression refrigeration. The main advantages of a Peltier cooler (compared to a vapor-compression refrigerator) are its lack of moving parts or refrigerant, and its small size and flexible shape (form factor).

The main disadvantage of Peltier coolers is low efficiency. It is estimated that materials with ZT>3 (about 20–30% Carnot efficiency) would be required to replace traditional coolers in most applications. Today, Peltier coolers are only used in niche applications, especially small scale, where efficiency is not important.

=== Power generation ===
Thermoelectric efficiency depends on the figure of merit, ZT. There is no theoretical upper limit to ZT, and as ZT approaches infinity, the thermoelectric efficiency approaches the Carnot limit. However, until recently no known thermoelectrics had a ZT>3. In 2019, researchers reported a material with approximated ZT between 5 and 6.

As of 2010, thermoelectric generators serve application niches where efficiency and cost are less important than reliability, light weight, and small size.

Internal combustion engines capture 20–25% of the energy released during fuel combustion. Increasing the conversion rate can increase mileage and provide more electricity for on-board controls and creature comforts (stability controls, telematics, navigation systems, electronic braking, etc.) It may be possible to shift energy draw from the engine (in certain cases) to the electrical load in the car, e.g., electrical power steering or electrical coolant pump operation.

Cogeneration power plants use the heat produced during electricity generation for alternative purposes; being this more profitable in industries with high amounts of waste energy.

Thermoelectrics may find applications in such systems or in solar thermal energy generation.

== See also ==
- Batteryless radio
- Pyroelectric effect
- Thermionic converter

== Bibliography ==
- Rowe, D.M. (2018) [2006]. Thermoelectrics Handbook: Macro to Nano. CRC Press. ISBN 978-1-4200-3890-3.
