= Polaritonics =

Model of phonons-polaritons

Figure 1: Polaritonics may resolve the incongruence between electronics, which suffers technological and physical barriers to increased speed, and photonics, which requires lossy integration of light source and guiding structures. Other quasiparticles/collective excitations such as magnon-polaritons and exciton-polaritons, their location identified above, may be exploitable in the same way that phonon-polaritons have been for polaritonics.

Polaritonics is an intermediate regime between photonics and sub-microwave electronics (see Fig. 1). In this regime, signals are carried by an admixture of electromagnetic and lattice vibrational waves known as phonon-polaritons, rather than currents or photons. Since phonon-polaritons propagate with frequencies in the range of hundreds of gigahertz to several terahertz, polaritonics bridges the gap between electronics and photonics. A compelling motivation for polaritonics is the demand for high speed signal processing and linear and nonlinear terahertz spectroscopy. Polaritonics has distinct advantages over electronics, photonics, and traditional terahertz spectroscopy in that it offers the potential for a fully integrated platform that supports terahertz wave generation, guidance, manipulation, and readout in a single patterned material.

Polaritonics, like electronics and photonics, requires three elements: robust waveform generation, detection, and guidance and control. Without all three, polaritonics would be reduced to just phonon-polaritons, just as electronics and photonics would be reduced to just electromagnetic radiation. These three elements can be combined to enable device functionality similar to that in electronics and photonics.

== Illustration ==
Figure 2: Fanciful depiction of a polaritonic circuit illustrating fully integrated terahertz wave generation, guidance, manipulation, and readout in a single patterned material. Phonon-polaritons are generated in the upper left and lower right hand corners by focusing femtosecond optical excitation pulses into the crystal near waveguide entrances. Phonon-polaritons propagate laterally away from the excitation region and into the waveguides. Signal processing and circuit functionality is facilitated by resonant cavities, reflectors, focusing elements, coupled waveguides, splitters, combiners, interferometers, and photonic bandgap structures created by milling channels that fully extend throughout the thickness of the crystal.

To illustrate the functionality of polaritonic devices, consider the hypothetical circuit in Fig. 2 (right). The optical excitation pulses that generate phonon-polaritons, in the top left and bottom right of the crystal, enter normal to the crystal face (into the page). The resulting phonon-polaritons will travel laterally away from the excitation regions. Entrance into the waveguides is facilitated by reflective and focusing structures. Phonon-polaritons are guided through the circuit by terahertz waveguides carved into the crystal. Circuit functionality resides in the interferometer structure at the top and the coupled waveguide structure at the bottom of the circuit. The latter employs a photonic bandgap structure with a defect (yellow) that could provide bistability for the coupled waveguide.

== Waveform generation ==
Phonon-polaritons generated in ferroelectric crystals propagate nearly laterally to the excitation pulse due to the high dielectric constants of ferroelectric crystals, facilitating easy separation of phonon-polaritons from the excitation pulses that generated them. Phonon-polaritons are therefore available for direct observation, as well as coherent manipulation, as they move from the excitation region into other parts of the crystal. Lateral propagation is paramount to a polaritonic platform in which generation and propagation take place in a single crystal. A full treatment of the Cherenkov-radiation-like terahertz wave response reveals that in general, there is also a forward propagation component that must be considered in many cases.

== Signal detection ==
Direct observation of phonon-polariton propagation was made possible by real-space imaging, in which the spatial and temporal profiles of phonon-polaritons are imaged onto a CCD camera using Talbot phase-to-amplitude conversion. This by itself was an extraordinary breakthrough. It was the first time that electromagnetic waves were imaged directly, appearing much like ripples in a pond when a rock plummets through the water's surface (see Fig. 3). Real-space imaging is the preferred detection technique in polaritonics, though other more conventional techniques like optical Kerr-gating, time resolved diffraction, interferometric probing, and terahertz field induced second-harmonic generation are useful in some applications where real-space imaging is not easily employed. For example, patterned materials with feature sizes on the order of a few tens of micrometres cause parasitic scattering of the imaging light. Phonon-polariton detection is then only possible by focusing a more conventional probe, like those mentioned before, into an unblemished region of the crystal.

Figure 3: Frames from a phonon-polariton movie of broadband phonon-polariton generation and propagation in lithium niobate taken with real-space imaging. The first frame shows the initial phonon-polaritons at the time of generation. Immediately afterwards, wavepackets travel away from the excitation region in both directions. The second frame, taken 30 ps after generation, shows two phonon-polaritons traveling to the right. The first (left) is the reflection of the initial left-going wavepacket and the other was initially traveling to the right.

== Guidance and control ==
The last element requisite to polaritonics is guidance and control. Complete lateral propagation parallel to the crystal plane is achieved by generating phonon-polaritons in crystals of thickness on the order of the phonon-polariton wavelength. This forces propagation to take place in one or more of the available slab waveguide modes. However, dispersion in these modes can be radically different from that in bulk propagation, and in order to exploit this, the dispersion must be understood.

Control and guidance of phonon-polariton propagation may also be achieved by guided wave, reflective, diffractive, and dispersive elements, as well as photonic and effective index crystals that can be integrated directly into the host crystal. However, lithium niobate, lithium tantalate, and other perovskites are impermeable to the standard techniques of material patterning. In fact, the only etchant known to be even marginally successful is hydrofluoric acid (HF), which etches slowly and predominantly in the direction of the crystal optic axis.

=== Laser Micromachining ===
Femtosecond laser micromachining is used for device fabrication by milling 'air' holes and/or troughs into ferroelectric crystals by directing them through the focus region of a femtosecond laser beam.. The advantages of femtosecond laser micromachining for a wide range of materials have been well documented. In brief, free electrons are created within the beam focus through multiphoton excitation. Because the peak intensity of a femtosecond laser pulse is many orders of magnitude higher than that from longer pulse or continuous wave lasers, the electrons are rapidly excited, heated to form a quantum plasma. Particularly in dielectric materials, the electrostatic instability, induced by the plasma, of the remaining lattice ions results in ejection of these ions and hence ablation of the material, leaving a material void in the laser focus region. Also, since the pulse duration and ablation time scales are much faster than the thermalization time, femtosecond laser micromachining does not suffer from the adverse effects of a heat-affected-zone, like cracking and melting in regions neighboring the intended damage region.

== See also ==
- Electronics
- Photonics
- Polariton
- Spintronics
- Polariton laser

== External references ==
- Feurer, T.; Stoyanov, Nikolay S.; Ward, David W.; Vaughan, Joshua C.; Statz, Eric R.; Nelson, Keith A. (2007). "Terahertz Polaritonics". Annual Review of Materials Research. 37 (1). Annual Reviews: 317–350. Bibcode:2007AnRMS..37..317F. doi:10.1146/annurev.matsci.37.052506.084327. ISSN 1531-7331. S2CID 33353438.
- Ward, D.W.; Statz, E.R.; Nelson, K.A. (2006-10-07). "Fabrication of polaritonic structures in LiNbO_{3} and LiTaO_{3} using femtosecond laser machining". Applied Physics A. 86 (1). Springer Science and Business Media LLC: 49–54. doi:10.1007/s00339-006-3721-y. ISSN 0947-8396. S2CID 96281166.
- David W. Ward: Polaritonics: An Intermediate Regime between Electronics and Photonics, Ph.D. Thesis, Massachusetts Institute of Technology, 2005. This is the main reference for this article.
- Ward, David W.; Statz, Eric R.; Nelson, Keith A.; Roth, Ryan M.; Osgood, Richard M. (2005-01-10). "Terahertz wave generation and propagation in thin-film lithium niobate produced by crystal ion slicing". Applied Physics Letters. 86 (2). AIP Publishing: 022908. Bibcode:2005ApPhL..86b2908W. doi:10.1063/1.1850185. ISSN 0003-6951.
- Ward, David W.; Beers, Jaime D.; Feurer, T.; Statz, Eric R.; Stoyanov, Nikolay S.; Nelson, Keith A. (2004-11-15). "Coherent control of phonon-polaritons in a terahertz resonator fabricated with femtosecond laser machining". Optics Letters. 29 (22). The Optical Society: 2671–3. Bibcode:2004OptL...29.2671W. doi:10.1364/ol.29.002671. ISSN 0146-9592. PMID 15552680.
- Feurer, T.; Vaughan, Joshua C.; Nelson, Keith A. (2003-01-17). "Spatiotemporal Coherent Control of Lattice Vibrational Waves". Science. 299 (5605). American Association for the Advancement of Science (AAAS): 374–377. Bibcode:2003Sci...299..374F. doi:10.1126/science.1078726. ISSN 0036-8075. PMID 12532012. S2CID 19627306.
- Stoyanov, Nikolay S.; Feurer, T.; Ward, David W.; Nelson, Keith A. (2003-02-03). "Integrated diffractive terahertz elements". Applied Physics Letters. 82 (5). AIP Publishing: 674–676. Bibcode:2003ApPhL..82..674S. doi:10.1063/1.1540241. ISSN 0003-6951.
- Stoyanov, Nikolay S.; Ward, David W.; Feurer, Thomas; Nelson, Keith A. (2002-09-02). "Terahertz polariton propagation in patterned materials". Nature Materials. 1 (2). Springer Nature: 95–98. Bibcode:2002NatMa...1...95S. doi:10.1038/nmat725. ISSN 1476-1122. PMID 12618821. S2CID 9066991.
