= Application of silicon-germanium thermoelectrics in space exploration =

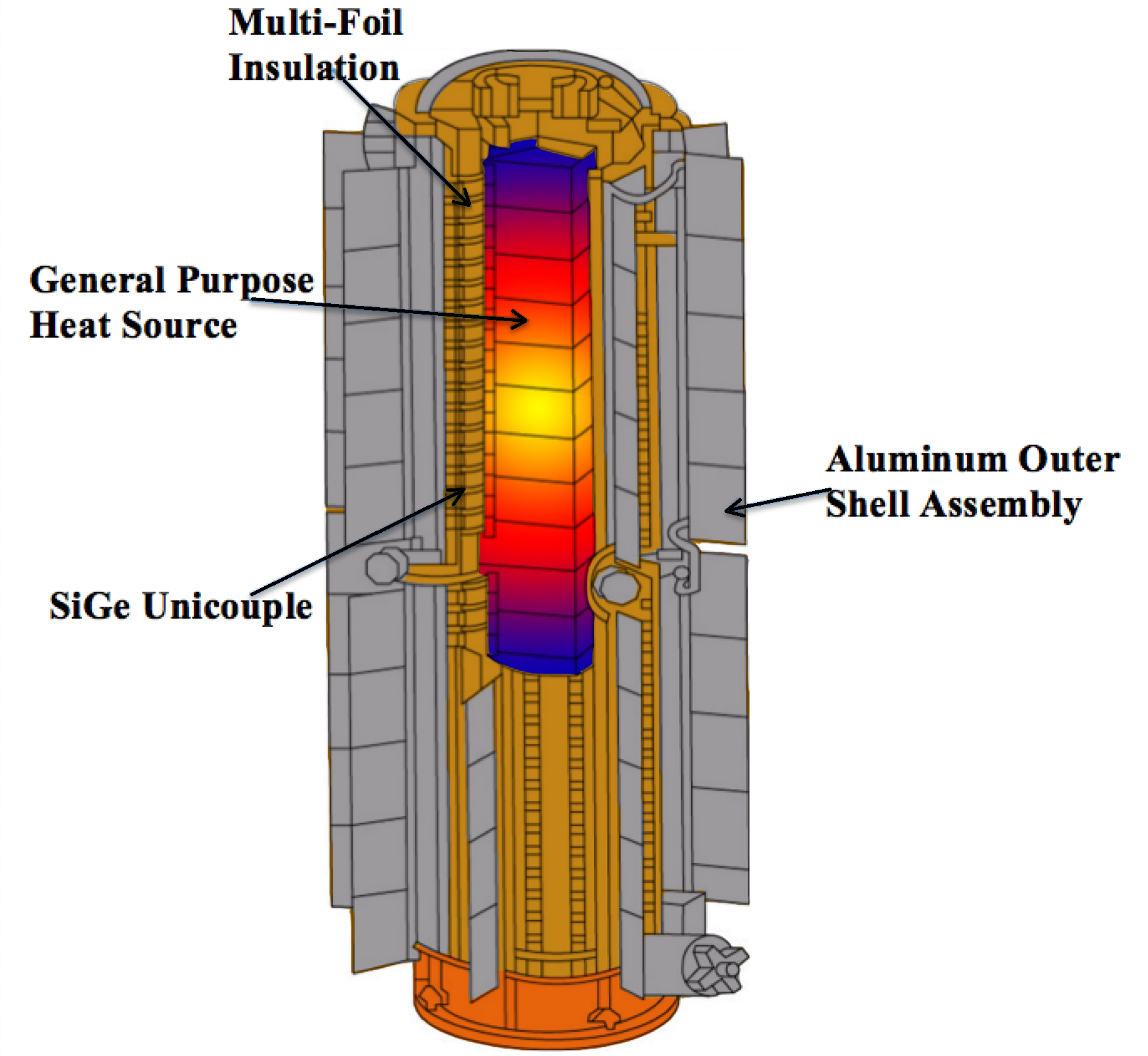
Essential components of a SiGe radioisotope thermoelectric generator

Silicon-germanium (SiGe) thermoelectrics have been used for converting heat into electrical power in spacecraft designed for deep-space NASA missions since 1976. This material is used in the radioisotope thermoelectric generators (RTGs) that power Voyager 1, Voyager 2, Galileo, Ulysses, Cassini, and New Horizons spacecraft. SiGe thermoelectric material converts enough radiated heat into electrical power to fully meet the power demands of each spacecraft. The properties of the material and the remaining components of the RTG contribute towards the efficiency of this thermoelectric conversion.

== Properties ==
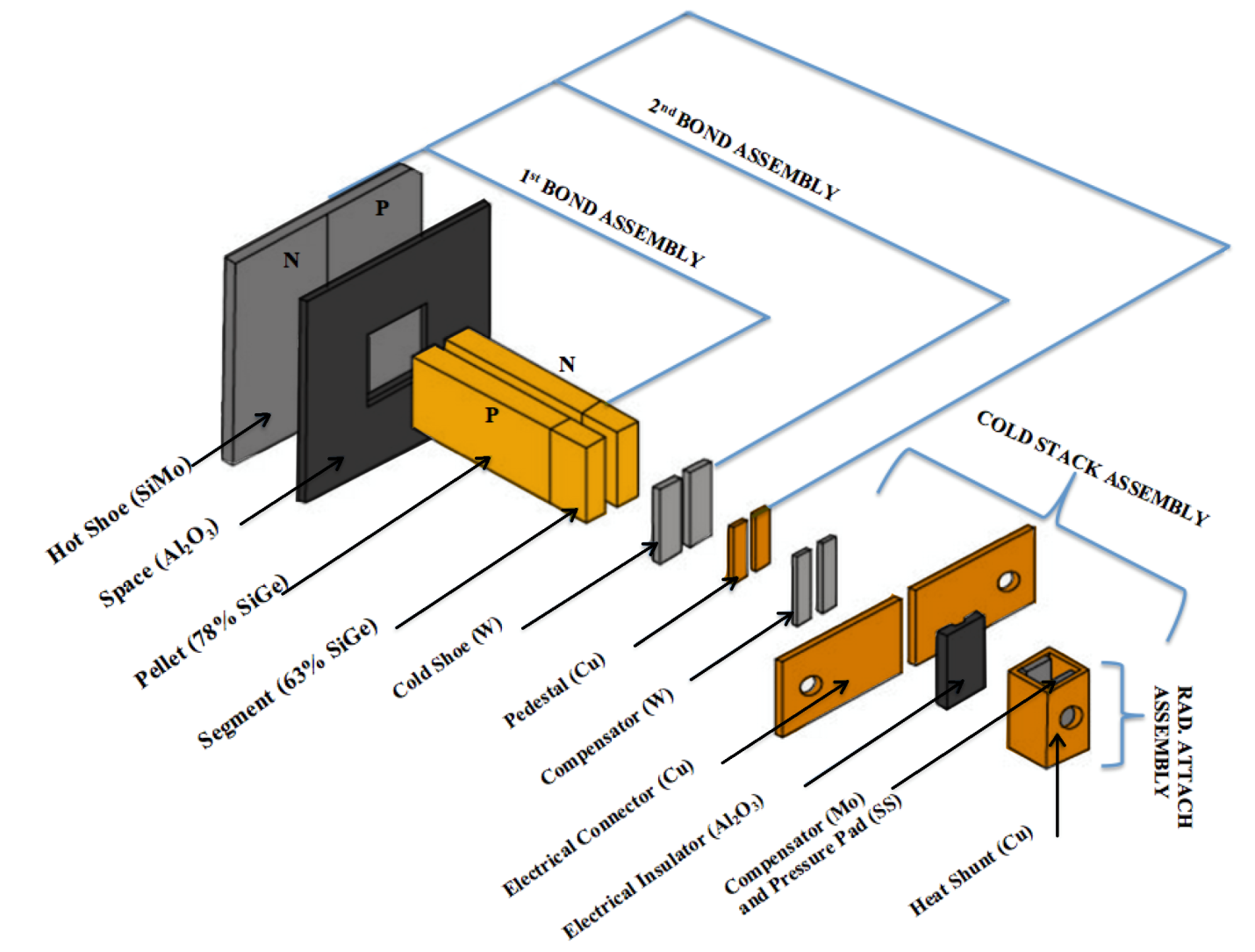
Components of the SiGe unicouple

Heavily doped semiconductors, such as silicon-germanium (SiGe) thermoelectric couples (also called thermocouples or unicouples), are used in space exploration.

SiGe alloys present good thermoelectric properties. Their performance in thermoelectric power production is characterized by high dimensionless figures-of-merit (ZT) under high temperatures, which has been shown to be near 2 in some nanostructured-SiGe models.

SiGe alloy devices are mechanically rugged and can withstand severe shock and vibration due to its high tensile strength (i.e. >7000 psi) and low dislocation density. SiGe material is malleable with standard metallurgical equipment and bonds easily to construct components. SiGe alloy devices can operate under high temperatures (i.e. >1300 ˚C) without degradation due to their electronic stability, low thermal expansion coefficient and high oxidation resistance.

Near the Sun, solar cell performance deteriorates from high incident particle flux and high temperatures from heat flux. However, thermoelectric energy conversion systems that use thermoelectric materials (e.g. SiGe alloys) as a supplemental source of power for missions near the Sun can operate unprotected in vacuum and air environments under high temperatures due to their low sensitivity to radiation damage. Such properties have made SiGe thermoelectrics convenient for power generation in space. The multifoil cold stack assembly, composed of molybdenum, tungsten, stainless steel, copper, and alumina materials, provides the insulation between the electrical and thermal currents of the system. The SiGe n-leg doped with boron and SiGe p-leg doped with phosphorus act as the intermediary between the heat source and electrical assembly.

== Power generation ==
SiGe thermocouples in an RTG convert heat directly into electricity. Thermoelectric power generation requires a constantly maintained temperature difference among the junctions of the two dissimilar metals (i.e. Si and Ge) to produce a low power closed circuit electric current without extra circuitry or external power sources.

A large array of SiGe thermocouples/unicouples form a thermopile that was incorporated into the design of radioisotope thermoelectric generators (RTGs) used in the missions Voyager, Galileo, Ulysses, Cassini, and New Horizons. On these spacecraft, Pu-238 dioxide fuel undergoes natural decay. The SiGe thermocouples/unicouples convert this heat to hundreds of Watts of electrical power.

== Thermocouple/unicouple assembly ==
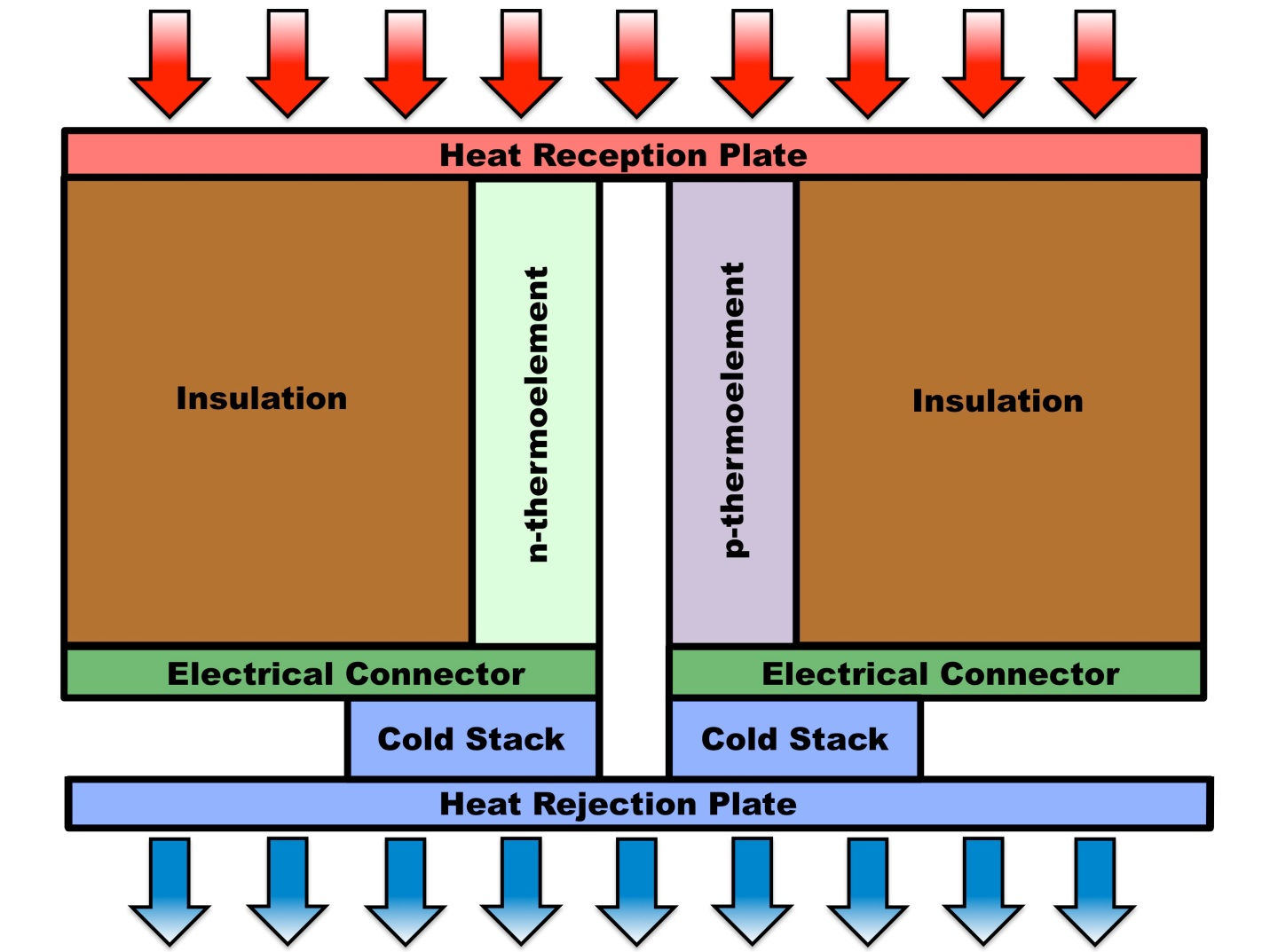
Conceptual diagram of a thermocouple (unicouple)

The thermocouples/unicouples attached to the outer shell consist of a SiGe alloy n-leg doped with boron and a SiGe p-leg doped with phosphorus to provide thermoelectric polarity to the couple. The electrical and thermal currents of the system are separated by bonding the SiGe alloy thermocouple to a multifoil cold stack assembly of molybdenum, tungsten, stainless steel, copper, and alumina components. Several layers of Astroquartz silica fiber yarn electrically insulate the legs of the SiGe thermocouples. In between the inner insulation system and the outer shell, copper connectors form the electrical circuit, which uses a two-string, series-parallel wiring design to connect the unicouples. The circuit loop arrangement minimizes the net magnetic field of the generator.

== Application history ==
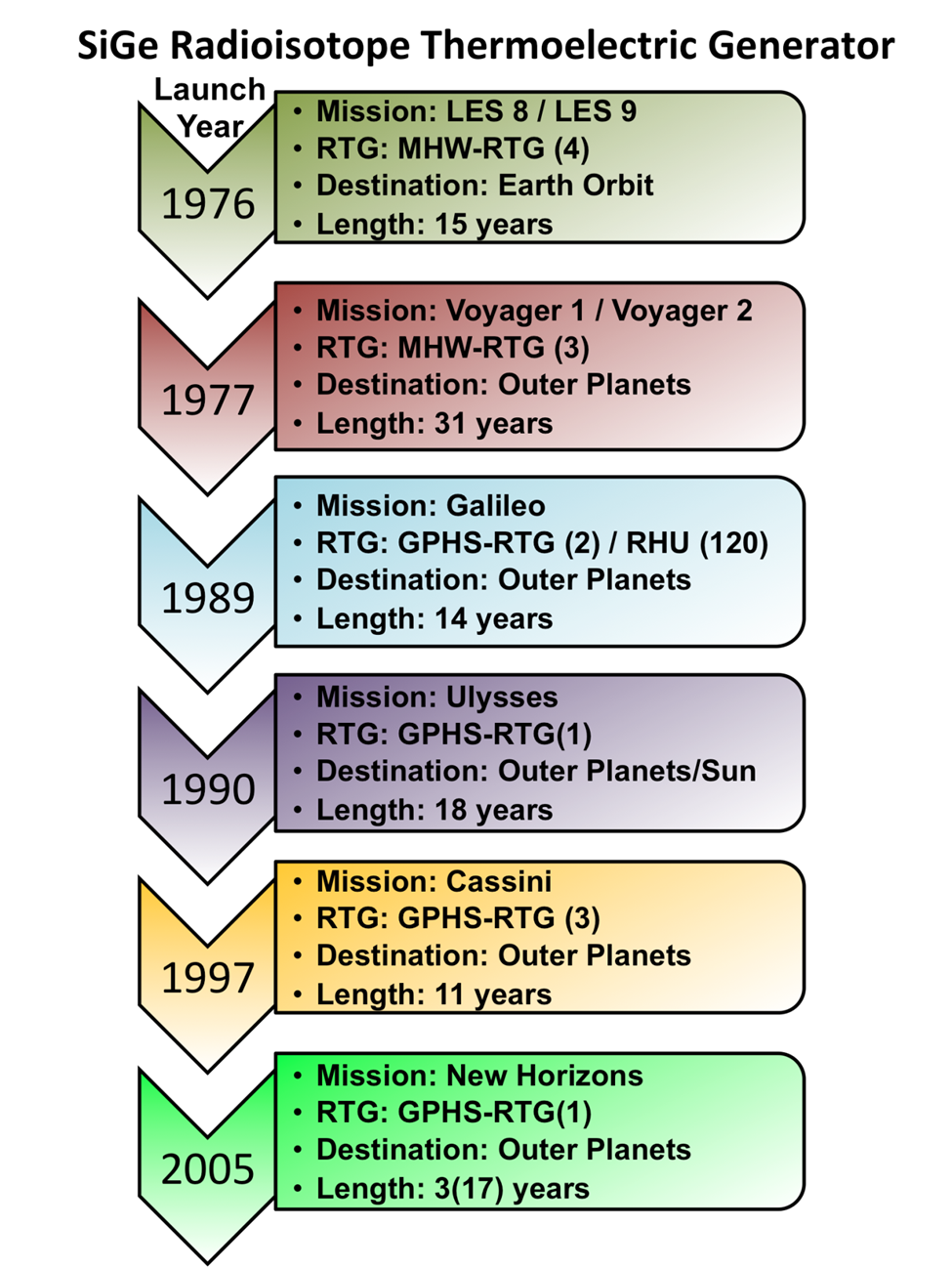
RTG Space Exploration Timeline

SiGe has been used as a material in RTGs since 1976. Each mission that has used RTG technology involves exploration of far-reaching regions of the Solar System. The most recent mission, New Horizons (2005), was originally set for a 3-year exploration, but was extended to 17 years.

=== Multi-hundred-watt (MHW) applications ===
Voyager 1 and Voyager 2 spacecraft launched in August and September 1977 required multi-hundred-watt (MHW) RTG containing plutonium oxide fuel spheres for an operational life appropriate for exploration of Jupiter, Saturn, Uranus, and Neptune. Conversion of the decay heat of the plutonium to electrical power was accomplished through 312 silicon-germanium (SiGe) thermoelectric couples. A hot junction temperature of 1273 K (1832 °F) with a cold junction temperature of 573 K (572 °F) compose the temperature gradient in the thermoelectric couple in the RTG. This mechanism provided the total electrical power to operate the spacecraft's instruments, communications and other power demands. The RTG on Voyager will produce adequate electrical power for spacecraft operation until about the year 2020. Similar MHW-RTG models are also used on the two U.S. Air Force communications Lincoln Experimental Satellites 8 and 9 (LES-8/9).

=== General purpose heat source (GPHS) applications ===
The Galileo spacecraft launched on October 18, 1989, the Ulysses on October 6, 1990, the Cassini on October 15, 1997, and the New Horizons on January 19, 2006. All of these spacecraft contain the general purpose heat source (GPHS) RTG commissioned by the U.S. Department of Energy. The GPHS-RTG employs identical heat-to-electrical conversion technology used in the MHW-RTGs from the Voyager missions, using SiGe thermocouples/unicouples and the Pu-238–fueled GPHS. New Horizons made its historic flyby past Pluto and its moons on July 14, 2015 (see JHU Applied Physics website). The spacecraft's next destination will be a small Kuiper Belt object (KBO) known as 486958 Arrokoth that orbits nearly a billion miles beyond Pluto. Based on performance, data and modeling for the SiGe alloy RTGs, the GPHS-RTGs on Ulysses, Cassini and New Horizons are expected to meet or exceed the remaining power performance requirements for their deep-space missions.

== RTG alternative ==
Missions after 2010 requiring RTGs will instead use the multi-mission radioisotope thermoelectric generator (MMRTG) containing lead telluride (PbTe) thermocouples and Pu-238 dioxide for spacecraft power applications.

== See also ==
- Thermoelectric cooling
- Advanced Stirling Radioisotope Generator
- Radioisotope heater units
