= Snapback =

Snapback may refer to:

- Snapback (sanctions), a legal mechanism to restore penalties agreed previously at the United Nations
- Snapback (electrical), a mechanism whereby a bipolar transistor turns on due to avalanche breakdown or impact ionization providing base current
- Snapback (hat), a hat which is snapped in the back, and can be adjusted to fit
- "Snapback" (song), a song by the band Old Dominion from the album Meat and Candy
- Snapback, a capturing tactic in the board game Go
