= Alvin Joseph =

Alvin Joseph is an electrical engineer with the IBM Thomas J. Watson Research Center in Yorktown Heights, New York. He was named a Fellow of the Institute of Electrical and Electronics Engineers (IEEE) in 2016 for his contributions to silicon-germanium bipolar-CMOS and RF silicon-on-insulator technology.
