= Silicon-tin =

- The view of the SiSn lattice as seen from the <100> direction. Silicon atoms further from the cross-section are displayed using a lighter shade of blue. The red atom is the Sn atom occupying a silicon lattice point.
- Material type: Alloy

Silicon-tin or SiSn, is in general a term used for an alloy of the form Si_{(1-x)}Sn_{x}. The molecular ratio of tin in silicon can vary based on the fabrication methods or doping conditions. In general, SiSn is known to be intrinsically semiconducting, and even small amounts of Sn doping in silicon can also be used to create strain in the silicon lattice and alter the charge transport properties.

== Theoretical studies ==
Several theoretical works have shown SiSn to be semiconducting. These mainly include DFT-based studies. The band structures obtained using these works show a change in band gap of silicon with the inclusion of tin into the silicon lattice. Thus, like SiGe, SiSn has a variable band gap that can be controlled using Sn concentration as a variable. In 2015, Hussain et al. experimentally verified the tuning of band gap associated with the diffusion of tin using homogeneous, abrupt p-n junction diodes.

== Production ==
SiSn can be obtained experimentally using several approaches. For small quantity of Sn in silicon, the Czochralski process is well known. Diffusion of tin into silicon has also been tried extensively in the past. Sn has the same valency and electronegativity as silicon and can be found in the diamond cubic crystal structure (α-Sn). Thus, silicon and tin meet three out of the four Hume-Rothery rules for solid state solubility. The one criterion that is not met is that of difference in atomic size. The tin atom is substantially larger than the silicon atom (31.8%). This reduces the solid state solubility of tin in silicon.

== Electrical performance ==
The first MOSFET (metal–oxide–semiconductor field-effect transistor) using SiSn as a channel material was shown in 2013. This study proved that SiSn can be used as semiconductor for MOSFET fabrication, and that there may be certain applications where the use of SiSn instead of silicon may be more advantageous. In particular, the off current of SiSn transistors is much lower than that of silicon transistors. Thus, logic circuits based on SiSn MOSFETs consume lower static power compared to silicon-based circuits. This is advantageous in battery operated devices (LSTP devices), where the standby power has to be reduced for longer battery life.

== Thermal conductivity ==
Si-Sn alloys have the lowest conductivity (3 W/mK) of all the bulk alloys among Si-Ge, Ge-Sn, and Si-Ge-Sn; less than half that of Si-Ge which has been extensively studied, attributed to the larger difference in mass between the two constituents. In addition, thin films offer an additional reduction in thermal conductivity, reaching around 1 W/mK in 20-nm-thick Si-Sn, Ge-Sn, and ternary Si-Ge-Sn films, which is near the conductivity of amorphous SiO_{2}. Group-IV alloys containing Sn have the potential for high-efficiency thermoelectric energy conversion.

== See also ==
- Silicon carbide
- Silicon-germanium
