= Alumel =

Metal alloy

Alumel is an alloy consisting of approximately 95% nickel, 2% aluminium, 2% manganese, and 1% silicon. This magnetic alloy is used to make the negative conductors of ANSI Type K (chromel-alumel) thermocouples and thermocouple extension wire. Alumel is a registered trademark of Concept Alloys, Inc.

Properties of Alumel (95% Ni, 2% Al, 2% Mn, 1% Si)
| Electrical resistivity | 0.294 μΩ m |
| Temperature coefficient | 23.9×10^{−4} K^{−1} |
| Curie point | 152 °C |
| Density | 8.61 g cm^{−3} |
| Melting point | 1399 °C |
| Tensile strength (annealed) | 586 MPa |
| Tensile strength (stress relieved) | 1030 MPa |
| Tensile strength (hard) | 1170 MPa |
| Coefficient of thermal expansion | 12×10^{−6}K^{−1} at 20 °C |
| Specific heat | 0.523 J g^{−1} K^{−1} |
| Thermal conductivity | 29.7 W m^{−1} K^{−1} |
