= Isobutylgermane =

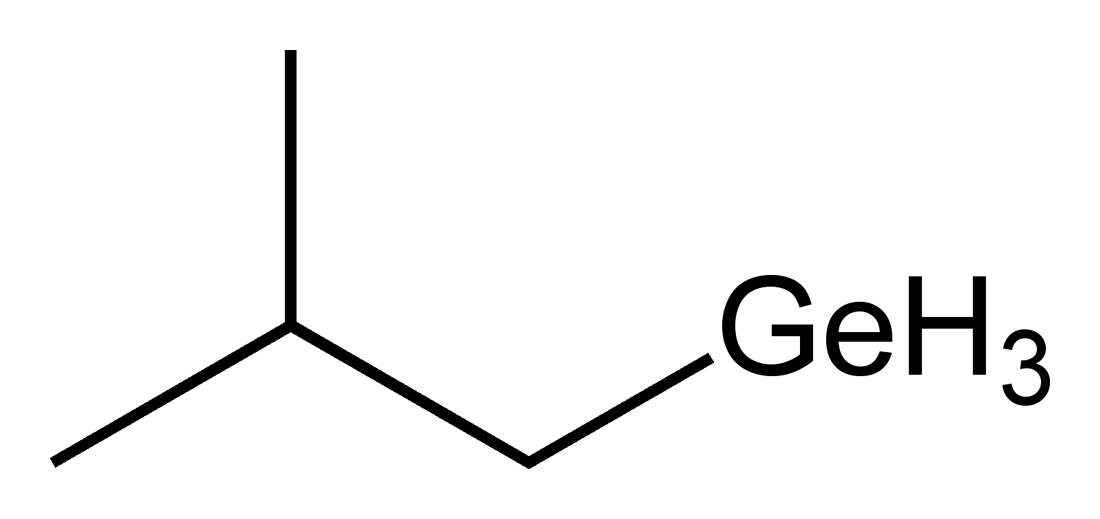

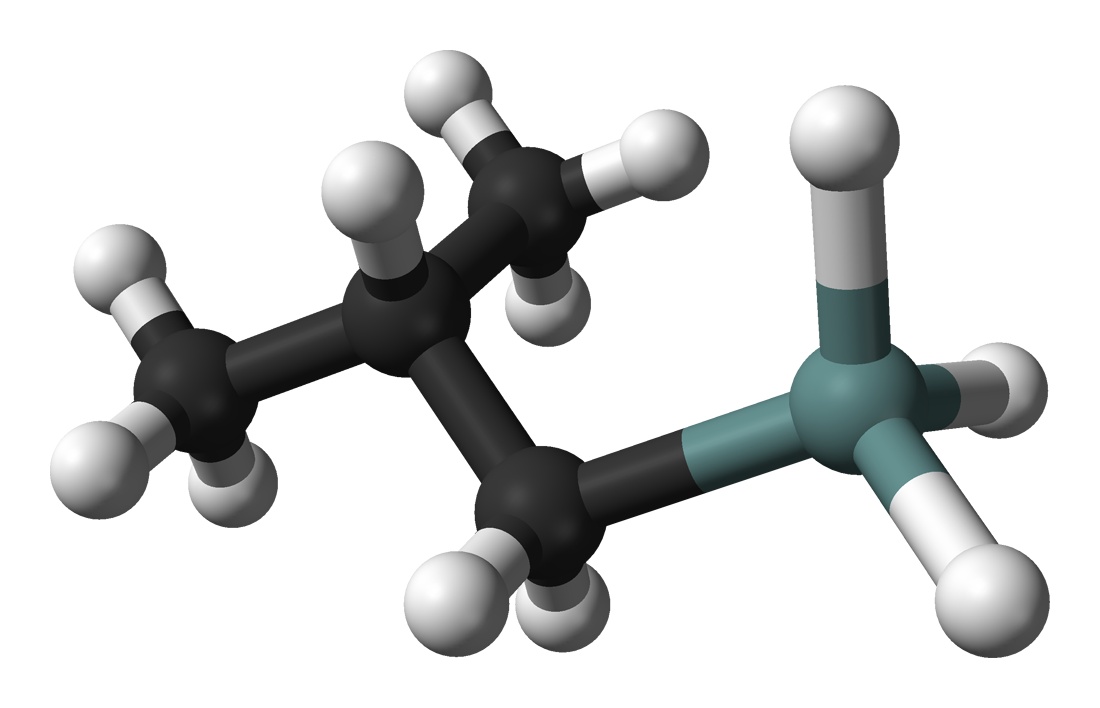

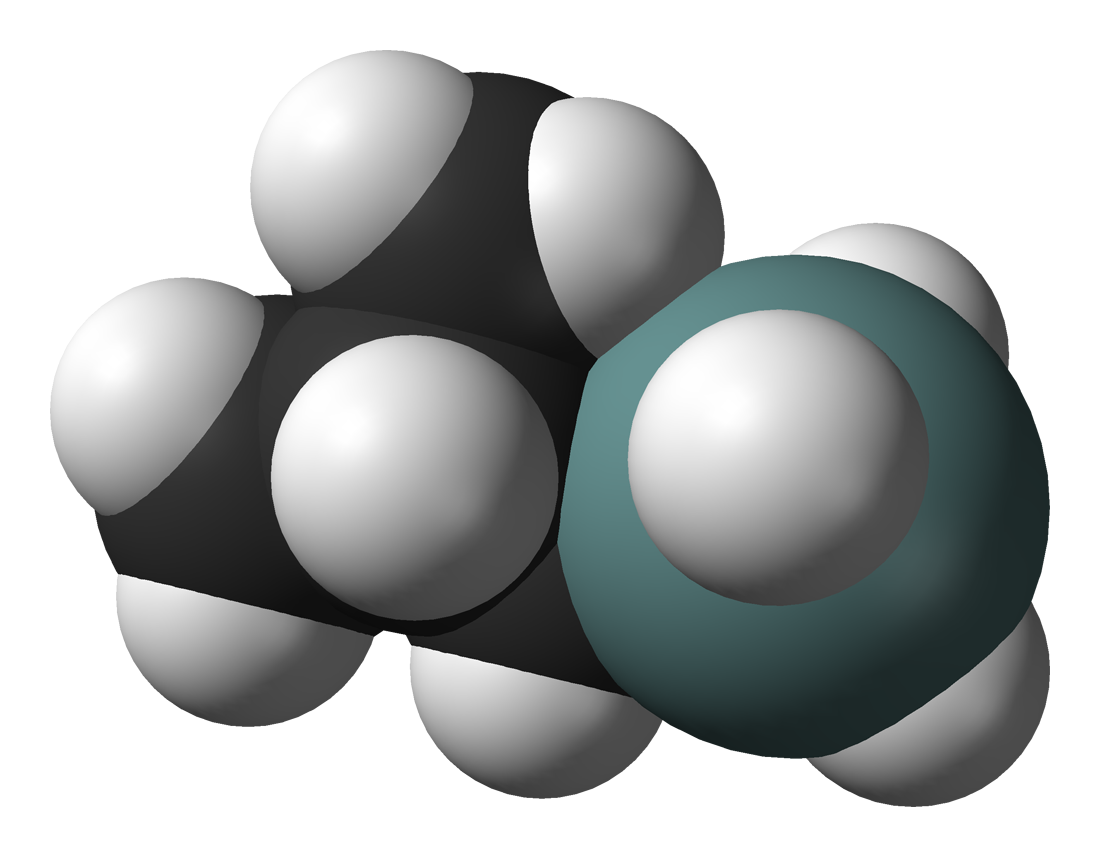

Names
- Preferred IUPAC name (2-Methylpropyl)germane
- Other names Isobutylgermane

Identifiers
| CAS Number | 768403-89-0 |
| 3D model (JSmol) | Interactive image |
| ChemSpider | 21389305 |
| ECHA InfoCard | 100.208.368 |
| EC Number | 682-844-5 |
| PubChem CID | 102393253 |
| UNII | RB23LE749Q |
| CompTox Dashboard (EPA) | DTXSID40726813 |
- InChI: InChI=1S/C4H12Ge/c1-4(2)3-5/h4H,3H2,1-2,5H3 Key: PILXXBFWCYMNMX-UHFFFAOYSA-N; InChI=1/C4H12Ge/c1-4(2)3-5/h4H,3H2,1-2,5H3 Key: PILXXBFWCYMNMX-UHFFFAOYAD
- SMILES: CC(C)C[Ge]

Properties
| Chemical formula | C_{4}H_{12}Ge |
| Molar mass | 132.78 g mol^{−1} |
| Appearance | Clear Colorless Liquid |
| Density | 0.96 g/mL |
| Melting point | < −78 °C (−108 °F; 195 K) |
| Boiling point | 66 °C (151 °F; 339 K) |
| Solubility in water | Insoluble in water |

Related compounds
| Related compounds | GeH_{4} |
- Except where otherwise noted, data are given for materials in their standard state (at 25 °C [77 °F], 100 kPa). verify (what is ?) Infobox references

Isobutylgermane (IBGe, Chemical formula: (CH_{3})_{2}CHCH_{2}GeH_{3}, is an organogermanium compound. It is a colourless, volatile liquid that is used in MOVPE (Metalorganic Vapor Phase Epitaxy) as an alternative to germane. IBGe is used in the deposition of Ge films and Ge-containing thin semiconductor films such as SiGe in strained silicon applications, and GeSbTe in NAND Flash applications.

== Properties ==
IBGe is a non-pyrophoric liquid source for chemical vapor deposition (CVD) and atomic layer deposition (ALD) of semiconductors. It possesses very high vapor pressure and is considerably less hazardous than germane gas. IBGe also offers lower decomposition temperature (the onset of decomposition at ca. 325-350 °C)., coupled with advantages of low carbon incorporation and reduced main group elemental impurities in epitaxially grown germanium comprising layers such as Ge, SiGe, SiGeC, strained silicon, GeSb, and GeSbTe.

== Uses ==
Rohm and Haas (now part of The Dow Chemical Company), IMEM, and CNRS have developed a process to grow germanium films on germanium at low temperatures in a Metalorganic Vapor Phase Epitaxy (MOVPE) reactor using isobutylgermane. The research targets Ge/III-V hetero devices. It has been demonstrated that the growth of high quality germanium films at temperatures as low as 350 °C can be achieved. The low growth temperature of 350 °C achievable with this new precursor has eliminated the memory effect of germanium in III-V materials. Recently IBGe is used to deposit Ge epitaxial films on a Si or Ge substrate, followed by the MOVPE deposition of InGaP and InGaAs layers with no memory effect, to enable triple-junction solar cells and integration of III-V compounds with silicon and germanium. It was demonstrated that isobutylgermane could be also used for the growth of germanium nanowires using gold as catalyst
