= Chromel =

Trademark for a family of chromium-nickel alloys

Chromel is an alloy made of approximately 90% nickel and 10% chromium by weight that is used to make the positive conductors of ANSI Type E (chromel-constantan) and K (chromel-alumel) thermocouples. It can be used at temperatures up to 1,100 °C (2,010 °F) in oxidizing atmospheres. Chromel is a registered trademark of Concept Alloys, Inc.

Characteristics and properties of chromel (Ni, 90%; Cr, 10% by weight)
Characteristic	Value
Temperature coefficient	0.00032 K^{−1}
Electrical resistivity	0.706 μΩ m
Mechanical
Elongation at break	<44%
Izod impact strength	108 J m^{−1}
Modulus of elasticity	186 GPa
Tensile strength	620–780 MPa
Physical
Density	8.5 g cm^{−3}
Melting point	1420 °C
Magnetic	Non-Magnetic
Thermal
Coefficient of thermal expansion	12.8×10^{−6} K^{−1} at 20–1000 °C
Maximum use temperature in air	1100 °C
Thermal conductivity	19 W m^{−1} K^{−1} at 23 °C

== Chromel A ==
Chromel A is an alloy containing approximately 80% nickel and 20% chromium (by weight), with low-level quantities of Si (1%), Fe (0.5%), and Ni. It is used for its excellent resistance to high-temperature corrosion and oxidation. It is also commonly called Nichrome 80-20, and is used for electric heating elements.

== Chromel C ==
Chromel C is an alloy containing 60% nickel, 16% chromium and 24% iron. It is also commonly called Nichrome 60 and is used for heating elements, resistance windings, and hot wire cutters.

== Chromel-R ==
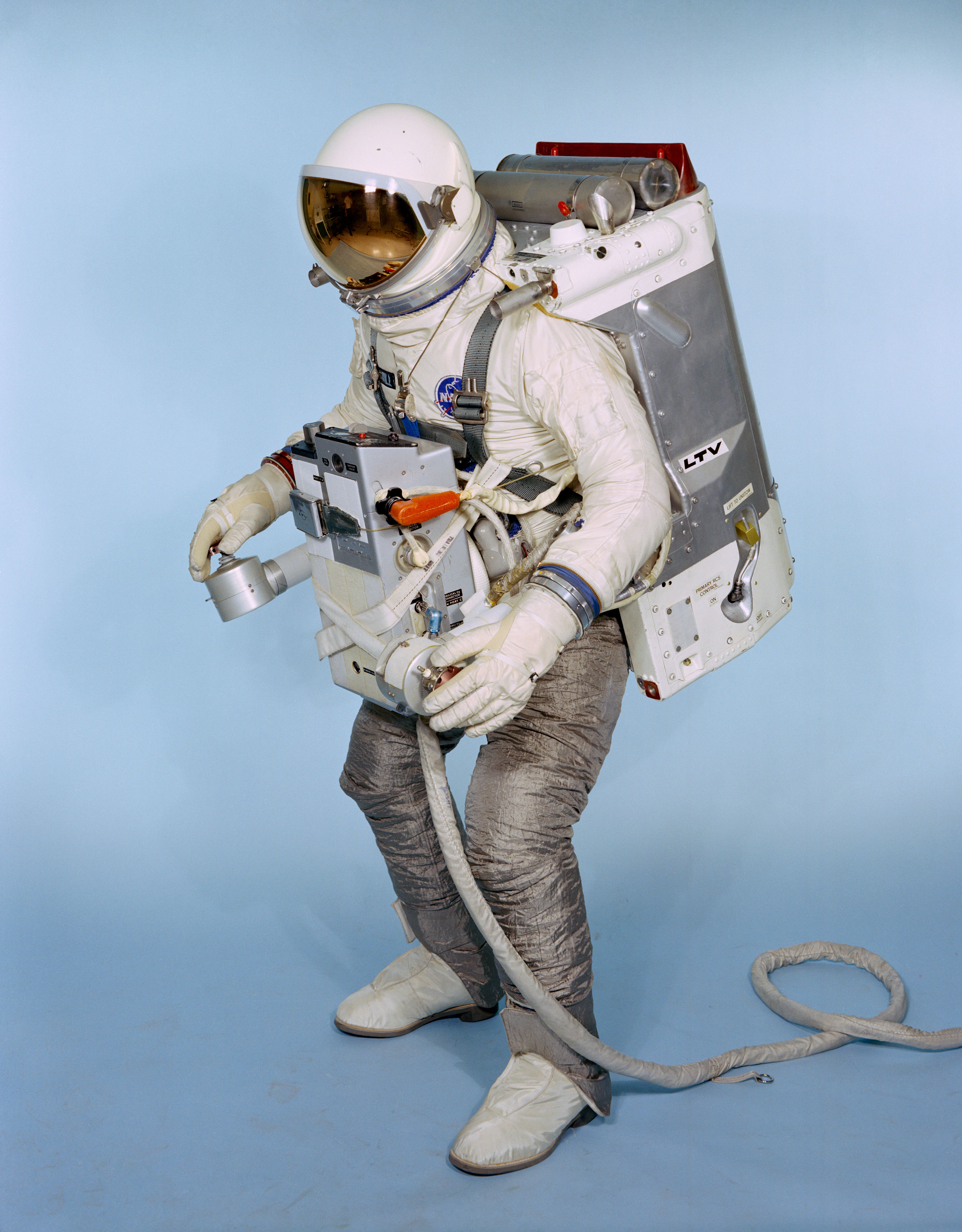
Gene Cernan's suit for Gemini 9A, showing the protective trouser layer

Chromel R has a composition of Cr 20%, Ni 80%.

Chromel-R was also produced as a woven fabric of chromel wires for improved flexibility compared to sheet metal. It was developed by Litton Industries for use by NASA in the Gemini and Apollo programs.

The Gemini G4C spacesuit did not use Chromel-R as standard. However the Gemini 9 mission was to test the use of the Astronaut Maneuvering Unit, a free-flying 'rocket pack'. To protect against the hot exhaust of its hydrogen peroxide engine, Gene Cernan's suit was given additional protection with an over-trouser layer of Chromel-R. The spacewalk during this flight gave a number of problems, with Cernan overheating and finding the suit difficult to move in it, with "all the flexibility of a rusty suit of armor". The Chromel-R layer was an integral part of the spacesuit, although the confined Gemini capsule did not require much movement until the spacewalk. Once pressurised, the suit became difficult to move in.

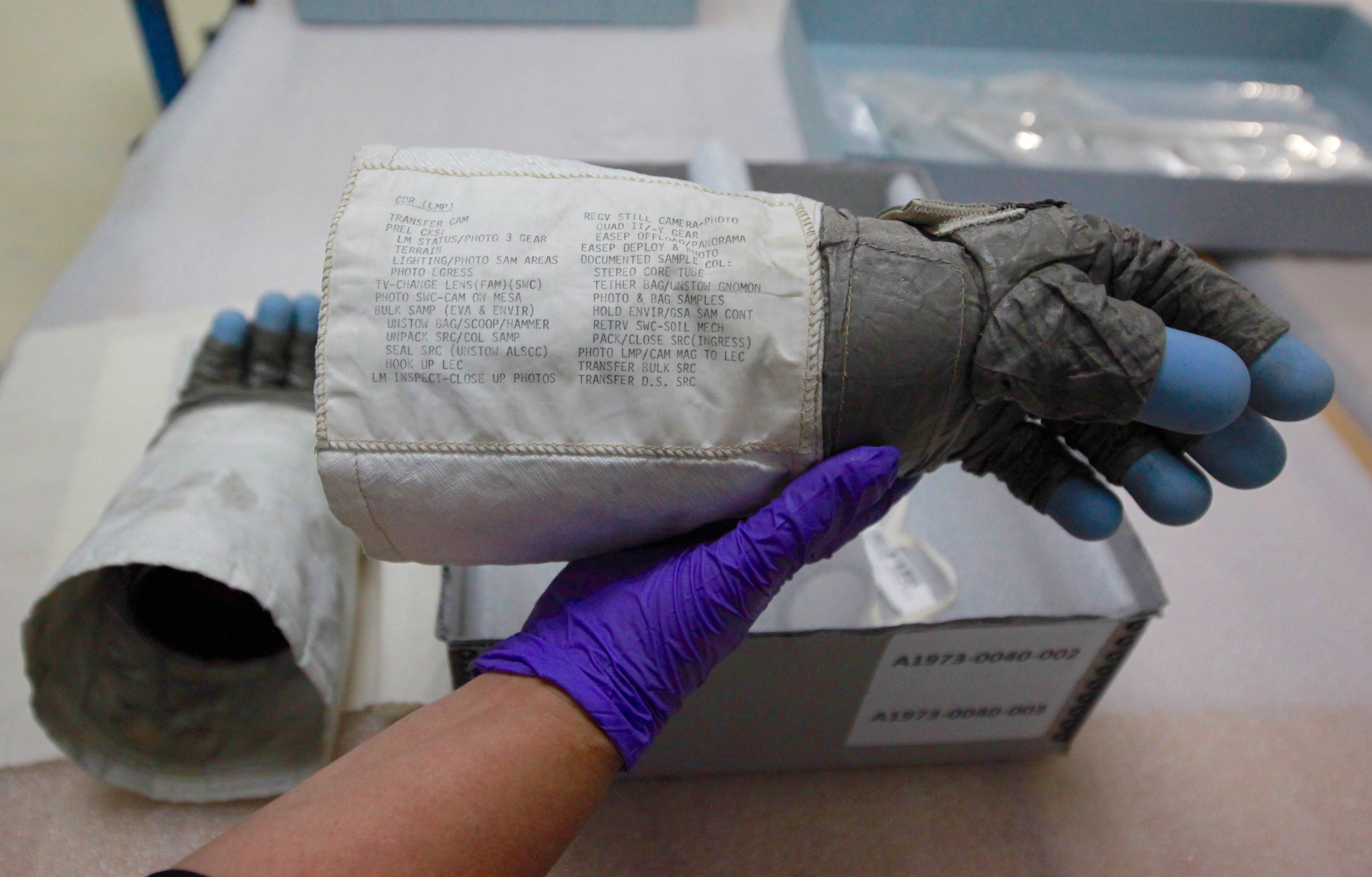
Apollo 11 lunar EVA glove. The grey areas are Chromel-R

Smaller patches of Chromel-R formed an outer layer of the Apollo spacesuit where abrasion resistance was needed. These patches can be seen as silver-grey areas over the white Beta cloth of the main suit. Using patches, rather than an entire garment, avoided the flexibility problems with Gemini. The upper areas of the overshoes, the gloves and patches beneath the life support backpack were of Chromel-R. Gold-plated open-weave Chromel-R mesh has also been used as the reflecting surface for compact-folding parabolic antenna on spacecraft.
