= MHW-RTG =

Variety of thermoelectric generator

The Multihundred-watt radioisotope thermoelectric generator (MHW RTG) is a type of US radioisotope thermoelectric generator (RTG) developed for the Voyager spacecraft, Voyager 1 and Voyager 2. The Voyager generators continue to function nearly 50 years into the mission.

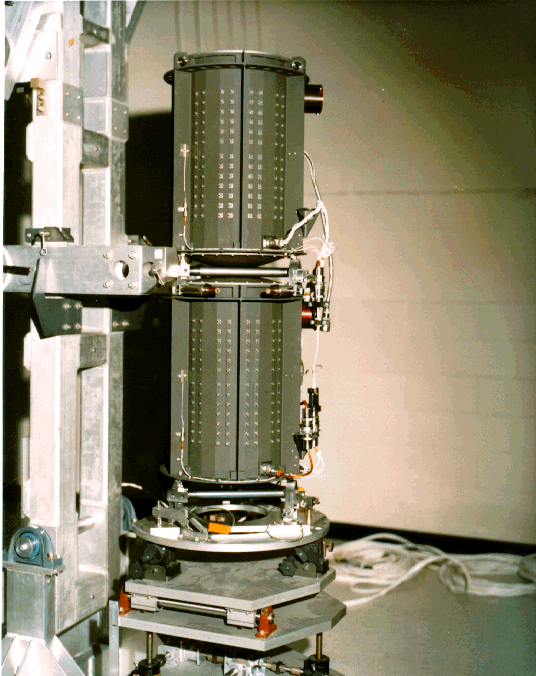
Radioisotope thermoelectric generators for the Voyager program.

Each RTG has a total weight of 37.7 kg, including about 4.5 kg of Pu-238 and uses 24 pressed plutonium-238 oxide spheres to provide enough heat to generate approximately 157 watts of electrical power initially – halving every 87.7 years.

Each RTG initially generated about 2400 watts of thermal power. Conversion of the decay heat of the plutonium to electrical power uses 312 silicon-germanium (SiGe) thermoelectric couples. The initial thermoelectric couple hot junction temperature was 1273 K (1000 °C, 1832 °F) with a cold junction temperature of 573 K (300 °C, 572 °F).

Each Voyager spacecraft has 3 RTGs. Collectively, the RTGs supply each Voyager spacecraft with 470 watts at launch.

MHW-RTGs were used on the Lincoln Experimental Satellites 8 and 9.

Subsequent US spacecraft used the GPHS-RTG, which used similar SiGe thermoelectric devices but a different packaging of the fuel.

The MMRTG is a newer RTG type, used on the Curiosity rover.

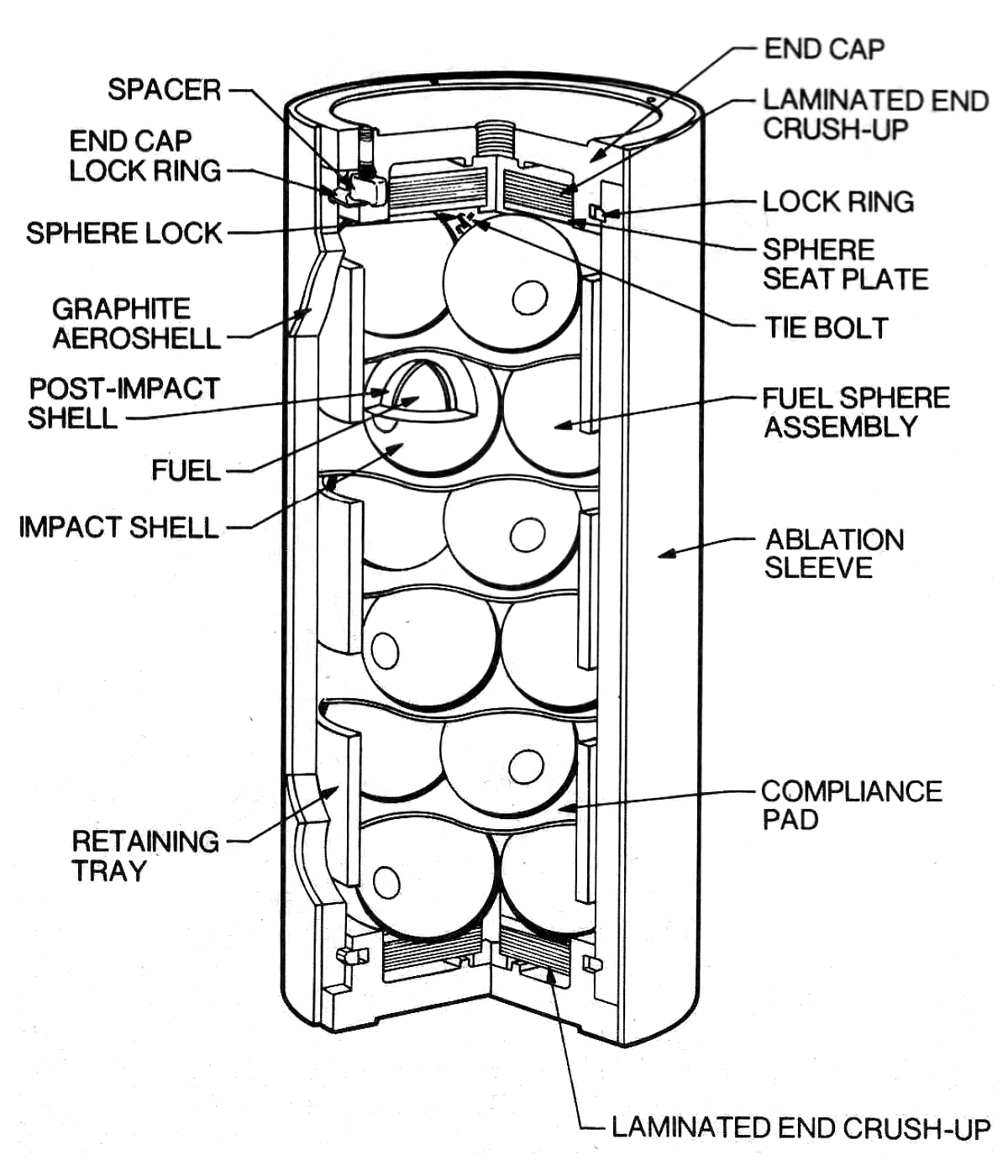
RTG heat source unit

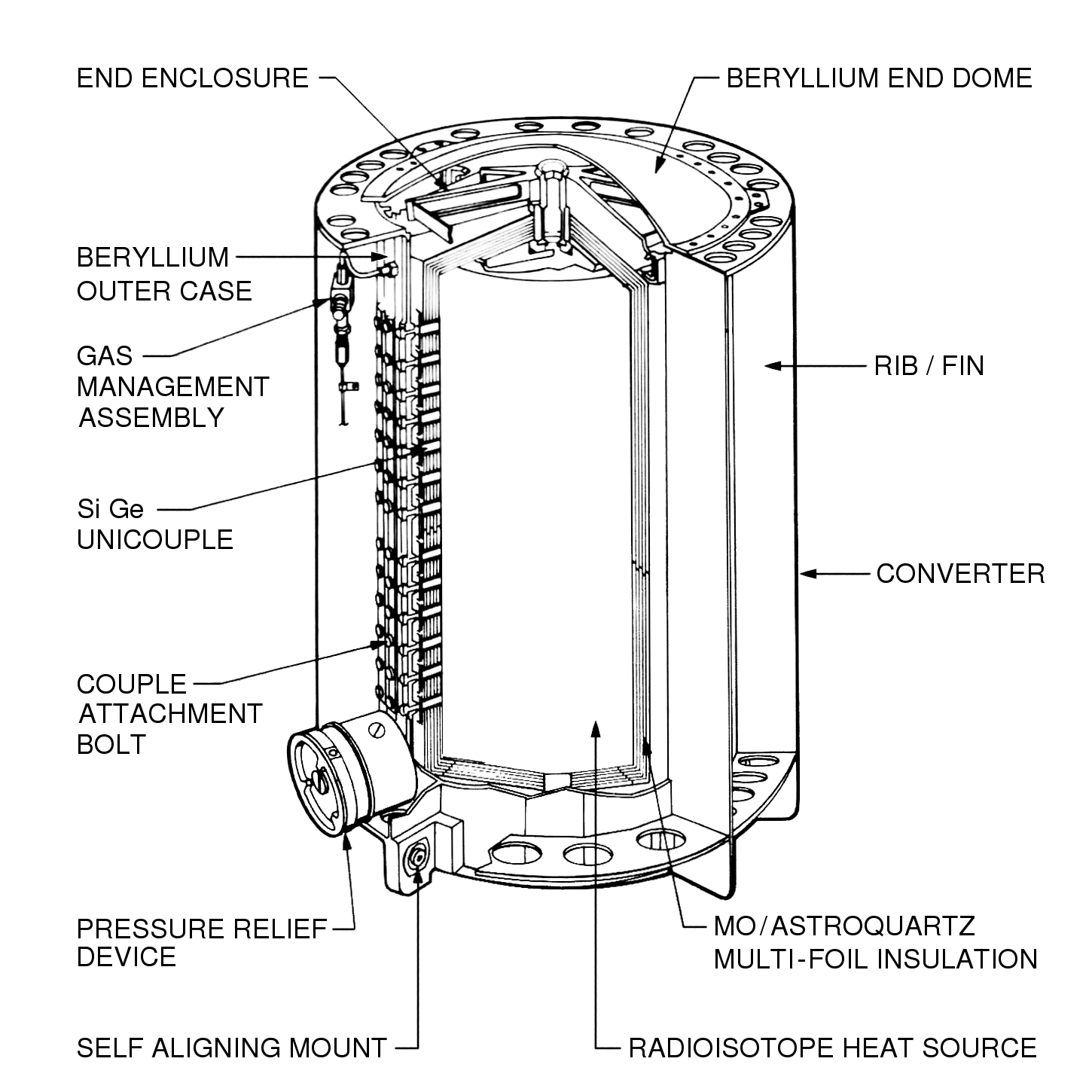
RTG diagram 1

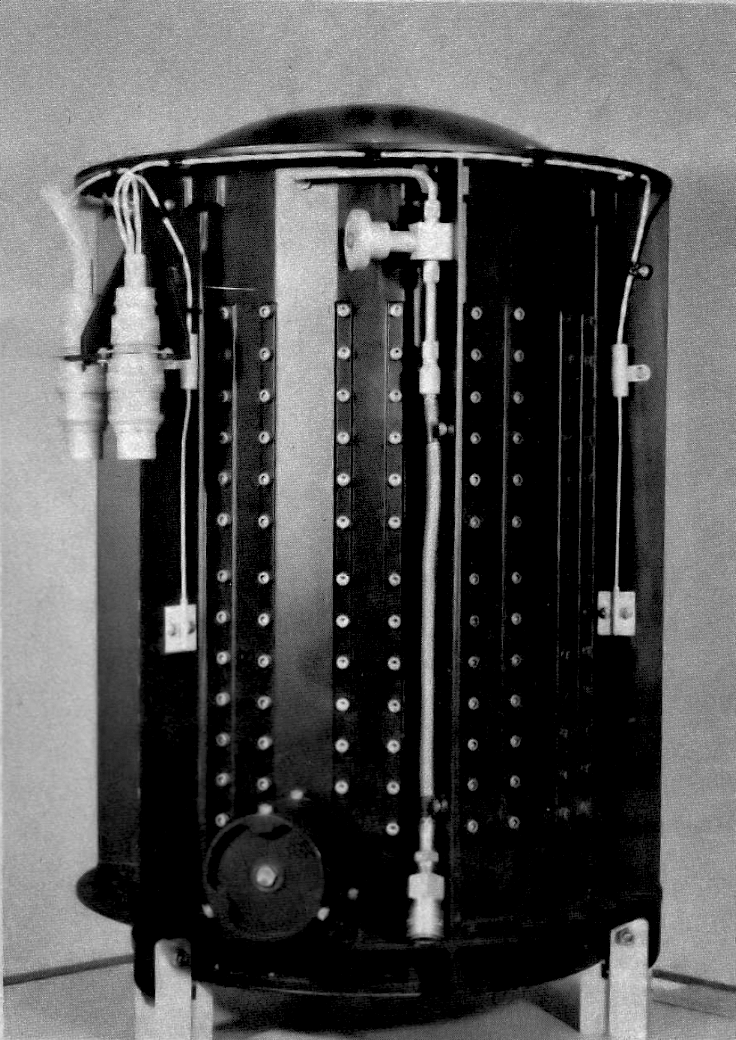
RTG unit

== See also ==
- Nuclear power in space
