= Strain engineering =

Strain engineering refers to a general strategy employed in semiconductor manufacturing to enhance device performance. Performance benefits are achieved by modulating strain, as one example, in the transistor channel, which enhances electron mobility (or hole mobility) and thereby conductivity through the channel. Another example is semiconductor photocatalysts strain-engineered for more effective use of sunlight.

== In CMOS manufacturing ==
The use of various strain engineering techniques has been reported by many prominent microprocessor manufacturers, including AMD, IBM, and Intel, primarily with regards to sub-130 nm technologies. One key consideration in using strain engineering in CMOS technologies is that PMOS and NMOS respond differently to different types of strain. Specifically, PMOS performance is best served by applying compressive strain to the channel, whereas NMOS receives benefit from tensile strain. Many approaches to strain engineering induce strain locally, allowing both n-channel and p-channel strain to be modulated independently.

One prominent approach involves the use of a strain-inducing capping layer. CVD silicon nitride is a common choice for a strained capping layer, in that the magnitude and type of strain (e.g. tensile vs compressive) may be adjusted by modulating the deposition conditions, especially temperature. Standard lithography patterning techniques can be used to selectively deposit strain-inducing capping layers, to deposit a compressive film over only the PMOS, for example.

Capping layers are key to the Dual Stress Liner (DSL) approach reported by IBM-AMD. In the DSL process, standard patterning and lithography techniques are used to selectively deposit a tensile silicon nitride film over the NMOS and a compressive silicon nitride film over the PMOS.

A second prominent approach involves the use of a silicon-rich solid solution, especially silicon-germanium, to modulate channel strain. One manufacturing method involves epitaxial growth of silicon on top of a relaxed silicon-germanium underlayer. Tensile strain is induced in the silicon as the lattice of the silicon layer is stretched to mimic the larger lattice constant of the underlying silicon-germanium. Conversely, compressive strain could be induced by using a solid solution with a smaller lattice constant, such as silicon-carbon. See, e.g., U.S. Patent No. 7,023,018. Another closely related method involves replacing the source and drain region of a MOSFET with silicon-germanium.

== In thin films ==
Strain can be induced in thin films with either epitaxial growth, or more recently, topological growth.

Epitaxial strain in thin films generally arises due to lattice mismatch between the film and its substrate and triple junction restructuring at the surface triple junction, which arises either during film growth or due to thermal expansion mismatch. Tuning this epitaxial strain can be used to moderate the properties of thin films and induce phase transitions. The misfit parameter ($f$) is given by the equation below:

$$f=(a_s - a_e)/a_e$$

where $a_e$ is the lattice parameter of the epitaxial film and $a_s$ is the lattice parameter of the substrate. After some critical film thickness, it becomes energetically favorable to relieve some mismatch strain through the formation of misfit dislocations or microtwins. Misfit dislocations can be interpreted as a dangling bond at an interface between layers with different lattice constants. This critical thickness ($h_c$) was computed by Mathews and Blakeslee to be:

$$h_c = \frac{b(2-\nu cos^2\alpha)[ln(h_c/b)+1]}{8\pi |f|(1+\nu)cos\lambda}$$

where $b$ is the length of the Burgers vector, $\nu$ is the Poisson ratio, $\alpha$ is the angle between the Burgers vector and misfit dislocation line, and $\lambda$ is the angle between the Burgers vector and the vector normal to the dislocation's glide plane. The equilibrium in-plane strain for a thin film with a thickness ($h$) that exceeds $h_c$ is then given by the expression:

$$\epsilon_{||} = \frac{f}{|f|}\frac{b(1-\nu cos^2(\alpha)[ln(h/b) +1]}{8\pi |f| (1+\nu)cos\lambda}$$

Strain relaxation at thin film interfaces via misfit dislocation nucleation and multiplication occurs in three stages which are distinguishable based on the relaxation rate. The first stage is dominated by glide of pre-existing dislocations and is characterized by a slow relaxation rate. The second stage has a faster relaxation rate, which depends on the mechanisms for dislocation nucleation in the material. Finally, the last stage represents a saturation in strain relaxation due to strain hardening.

Strain engineering has been well-studied in complex oxide systems, in which epitaxial strain can strongly influence the coupling between the spin, charge, and orbital degrees of freedom, and thereby impact the electrical and magnetic properties. Epitaxial strain has been shown to induce metal-insulator transitions and shift the Curie temperature for the antiferromagnetic-to-ferromagnetic transition in $\ce{La_{1-x}Sr_{x}MnO_{3}}$. In alloy thin films, epitaxial strain has been observed to impact the spinodal instability, and therefore impact the driving force for phase separation. This is explained as a coupling between the imposed epitaxial strain and the system's composition-dependent elastic properties.

Researchers more recently have achieved strain in thick oxide films larger than that achieved in epitaxial growth by incorporating nano-structured topologies (Guerra and Vezenov, 2002) and nanorods/nanopillars within an oxide film matrix. Following this work, researchers world-wide have created such self-organized, phase-separated, nanorod/nanopillar structures in numerous oxide films as reviewed here. In 2008, Thulin and Guerra published calculations of strain-modified anatase titania band structures, which included an indicated higher hole mobility with increasing strain. Additionally, in two dimensional materials such as WSe_{2} strain has been shown to induce conversion from an indirect semiconductor to a direct semiconductor allowing a hundred-fold increase in the light emission rate.

== In III-N LEDs ==
Strain engineering plays a major role in III-N LEDs, one of the most ubiquitous and efficient LED varieties that has only gained popularity after the 2014 Nobel Prize in Physics. Most III-N LEDs utilize a combination of GaN and InGaN, the latter being used as the quantum well region. The composition of In within the InGaN layer can be tuned to change the color of the light emitted from these LEDs. However, the epilayers of the LED quantum well have inherently mismatched lattice constants, creating strain between the layers. Due to the quantum confined Stark effect (QCSE), the electron and hole wave functions are misaligned within the quantum well, resulting in a reduced overlap integral, decreased recombination probability, and increased carrier lifetime. As such, applying an external strain can negate the internal quantum well strain, reducing the carrier lifetime and making the LEDs a more attractive light source for communications and other applications requiring fast modulation speeds.

With appropriate strain engineering, it is possible to grow III-N LEDs on Si substrates. This can be accomplished via strain relaxed templates, superlattices, and pseudo-substrates. Furthermore, electro-plated metal substrates have also shown promise in applying an external counterbalancing strain to increase the overall LED efficiency.

=== In DUV LEDs ===
In addition to traditional strain engineering that takes place with III-N LEDs, Deep Ultraviolet (DUV) LEDs, which use AlN, AlGaN, and GaN, undergo a polarity switch from TE to TM at a critical Al composition within the active region. The polarity switch arises from the negative value of AlN's crystal field splitting, which results in its valence bands switching character at this critical Al composition. Studies have established a linear relationship between this critical composition within the active layer and the Al composition used in the substrate templating region, underscoring the importance of strain engineering in the character of light emitted from DUV LEDs. Furthermore, any existing lattice mismatch causes phase separation and surface roughness, in addition to creating dislocations and point defects. The former results in local current leakage while the latter enhances the nonradiative recombination process, both reducing the device's internal quantum efficiency (IQE). Active layer thickness can trigger the bending and annihilation of threading dislocations, surface roughening, phase separation, misfit dislocation formation, and point defects. All of these mechanisms compete across different thicknesses. By delaying strain accumulation to grow at a thicker epilayer before reaching the target relaxation degree, certain adverse effects can be reduced.

== In nano-scale materials ==
Typically, the maximum elastic strain achievable in normal bulk materials ranges from 0.1% to 1%. This limits our ability to effectively modify material properties in a reversible and quantitative manner using strain. However, recent research on nanoscale materials has shown that the elastic strain range is much broader. Even the hardest material in nature, diamond, exhibits up to 9.0% uniform elastic strain at the nanoscale. Keeping in line with Moore's law, semiconductor devices are continuously shrinking in size to the nanoscale. With the concept of "smaller is stronger", elastic strain engineering can be fully exploited at the nanoscale.

In nanoscale elastic strain engineering, the crystallographic direction plays a crucial role. Most materials are anisotropic, meaning their properties vary with direction. This is particularly true in elastic strain engineering, as applying strain in different crystallographic directions can have a significant impact on the material's properties. Taking diamond as an example, Density Functional Theory (DFT) simulations demonstrate distinct behaviors in the bandgap decreasing rates when strained along different directions. Straining along the <110> direction results in a higher bandgap decreasing rate, while straining along the <111> direction leads to a lower bandgap decreasing rate but a transition from an indirect to a direct bandgap. A similar indirect-direct bandgap transition can be observed in strained silicon. Theoretically, achieving this indirect-direct bandgap transition in silicon requires a strain of more than 14% uniaxial strain.

== In 2D materials ==
In the case of elastic strain, when the limit is exceeded, plastic deformation occurs due to slip and dislocation movement in the microstructure of the material. Plastic deformation is not commonly utilized in strain engineering due to the difficulty in controlling its uniform outcome. Plastic deformation is more influenced by local distortion rather than the global stress field observed in elastic strain. However, 2D materials have a greater range of elastic strain compared to bulk materials because they lack typical plastic deformation mechanisms like slip and dislocation. Additionally, it is easier to apply strain along a specific crystallographic direction in 2D materials compared to bulk materials.

Recent research has shown significant progress in strain engineering in 2D materials through techniques such as deforming the substrate, inducing material rippling, and creating lattice asymmetry. These methods of applying strain effectively enhance the electric, magnetic, thermal, and optical properties of the material. For example, in the reference provided, the optical gap of monolayer and bilayer MoS2 decreases at rates of approximately 45 and 120 meV/%, respectively, under 0-2.2% uniaxial strain. Additionally, the photoluminescence intensity of monolayer MoS2 decreases at 1% strain, indicating an indirect-to-direct bandgap transition. The reference also demonstrates that strain-engineered rippling in black phosphorus leads to bandgap variations between +10% and -30%. In the case of ReSe2, the literature shows the formation of local wrinkle structures when the substrate is relaxed after stretching. This folding process results in a redshift in the absorption spectrum peak, leading to increased light absorption and changes in magnetic properties and bandgap. The research team also conducted I-V curve tests on the stretched samples and found that a 30% stretching resulted in lower resistance compared to the unstretched samples. However, a 50% stretching showed the opposite effect, with higher resistance compared to the unstretched samples. This behavior can be attributed to the folding of ReSe2, with the folded regions being particularly weak.

== See also ==
- Strained silicon
