= Urbach tail =

Phenomenon in semiconductor physics

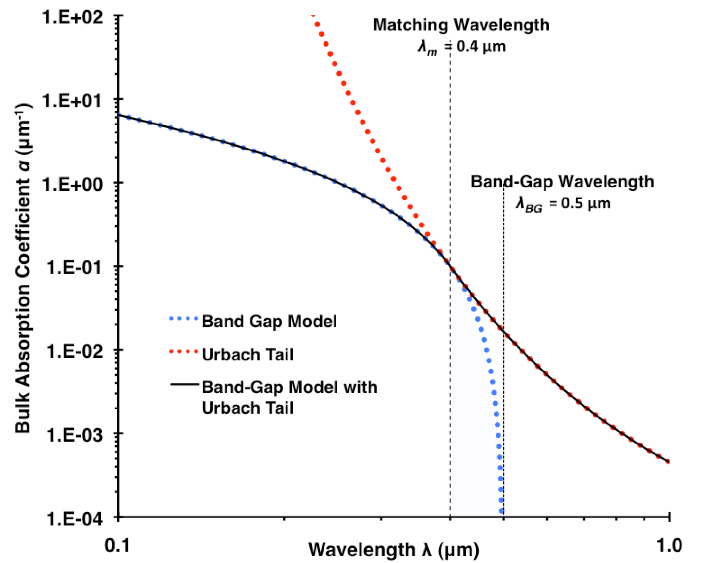
Band-gap model (blue dotted line), the Urbach-tail extension (red dotted line), and the band-gap model with Urbach tail (black solid line).

In the solid-state physics of semiconductors, the Urbach tail is an exponential part in the energy spectrum of the absorption coefficient. This tail appears near the optical band edge in amorphous, disordered and crystalline materials.

== History ==
Researchers began questioning the nature of "tail states" in disordered semiconductors in the 1950s. It was found that such tails arise from the strains sufficient to push local states past the band edges.

In 1953, the Austrian-American physicist Franz Urbach (1902–1969) found that such tails decay exponentially into the gap. Later, photoemission experiments delivered absorption models revealing temperature dependence of the tail.

A variety of amorphous crystalline solids expose exponential band edges via optical absorption. The universality of this feature suggested a common cause. Several attempts were made to explain the phenomenon, but these could not connect specific topological units to the electronic structure.

== See also ==
- Tauc plot
- Urbach energy
