= Silicon–germanium =

Chemical compound

SiGe (/ˈsɪɡiː/ or /ˈsaɪdʒiː/), or silicon–germanium, is an alloy with any molar ratio of silicon and germanium, i.e. with a molecular formula of the form Si_{1−x}Ge_{x}. It is commonly used as a semiconductor material in integrated circuits (ICs) for heterojunction bipolar transistors or as a strain-inducing layer for CMOS transistors. IBM introduced the technology into mainstream manufacturing in 1989. This relatively new technology offers opportunities in mixed-signal circuit and analog circuit IC design and manufacture. SiGe is also used as a thermoelectric material for high-temperature applications (>700 K).

== History ==
The first paper on SiGe was published in 1955 on the magnetoresistance of silicon germanium alloys. The first mention of SiGe devices was actually in the original patent for the bipolar transistor where the idea of a SiGe base in a heterojunction bipolar transistor (HBT) was discussed with a description of the physics in 1957. The first epitaxial growth of SiGe heterostructures which is required for a transistor was not demonstrated until 1975 by Erich Kasper and colleagues at the AEG Research Centre (now Daimler Benz) in Ulm, Germany using molecular-beam epitaxy (MBE).

== Production ==
The use of silicon–germanium as a semiconductor was championed by Bernie Meyerson. The challenge that had delayed its realization for decades was that germanium atoms are roughly 4% larger than silicon atoms. At the usual high temperatures at which silicon transistors were fabricated, the strain induced by adding these larger atoms into crystalline silicon produced vast numbers of defects, precluding the resulting material being of any use. Meyerson and co-workers discovered that the then believed requirement for high temperature processing was flawed, allowing SiGe growth at sufficiently low temperatures such that for all practical purposes no defects were formed. Once having resolved that basic roadblock, it was shown that resultant SiGe materials could be manufactured into high performance electronics using conventional low cost silicon processing toolsets. More relevant, the performance of resulting transistors far exceeded what was then thought to be the limit of traditionally manufactured silicon devices, enabling a new generation of low cost commercial wireless technologies such as WiFi. SiGe processes achieve costs similar to those of silicon CMOS manufacturing and are lower than those of other heterojunction technologies such as gallium arsenide. Recently, organogermanium precursors (e.g. isobutylgermane, alkylgermanium trichlorides, and dimethylaminogermanium trichloride) have been examined as less hazardous liquid alternatives to germane for MOVPE deposition of Ge-containing films such as high purity Ge, SiGe, and strained silicon.

SiGe foundry services are offered by several semiconductor technology companies. AMD disclosed a joint development with IBM for a SiGe stressed-silicon technology, targeting the 65 nm process. TSMC also sells SiGe manufacturing capacity.

In July 2015, IBM announced that it had created working samples of transistors using a 7 nm silicon–germanium process, promising a quadrupling in the amount of transistors compared to a contemporary process.

== SiGe transistors ==
SiGe allows CMOS logic to be integrated with heterojunction bipolar transistors, making it suitable for mixed-signal integrated circuits. heterojunction bipolar transistors have higher forward gain and lower reverse gain than traditional homojunction bipolar transistors. This translates into better low-current and high-frequency performance. Being a heterojunction technology with an adjustable bandgap, the SiGe offers the opportunity for more flexible bandgap tuning than silicon-only technology.

Silicon–germanium on insulator (SGOI) is a technology analogous to the silicon on insulator (SOI) technology currently employed in computer chips. SGOI increases the speed of the transistors inside microchips by straining the crystal lattice under the MOS transistor gate, resulting in improved electron mobility and higher drive currents. SiGe MOSFETs can also provide lower junction leakage due to the lower bandgap value of SiGe. However, a major issue with SGOI MOSFETs is the inability to form stable oxides with silicon–germanium using standard silicon oxidation processing.

== Thermoelectric application ==
The thermoelectric properties of SiGe was first measured in 1964 with p-SiGe having a ZT up to ~0.7 at 1000˚C and n-SiGe a ZT up to ~1.0 at 1000˚C which are some of the highest performance thermoelectrics at high temperatures. A silicon–germanium thermoelectric device MHW-RTG3 was used in the Voyager 1 and 2 spacecraft. Silicon–germanium thermoelectric devices were also used in other MHW-RTGs and GPHS-RTGs aboard Cassini, Galileo, Ulysses.

== Light emission ==
By controlling the composition of a hexagonal SiGe alloy, researchers from Eindhoven University of Technology developed a material that can emit light. In combination with its electronic properties, this opens up the possibility of producing a laser integrated into a single chip to enable data transfer using light instead of electric current, speeding up data transfer while reducing energy consumption and need for cooling systems. The international team, with lead authors Elham Fadaly, Alain Dijkstra and Erik Bakkers at Eindhoven University of Technology in the Netherlands and Jens Renè Suckert at Friedrich-Schiller-Universität Jena in Germany, were awarded the 2020 Breakthrough of the Year award by the magazine Physics World.

== See also ==
- Low-κ dielectric
- Silicon on insulator
- Silicon-tin
- Application of silicon-germanium thermoelectrics in space exploration
