= Pnictogen sesquichalcogenide =

Class of molecules

Pnictogen sesquichalcogenides, which are often shortened to sesquichalcogenides are a class of molecules with the formula Pn_{2}Ch_{3}, where Pn is a pnictogen (group 15 element) and Ch is a chalcogen (group 16 element). Molecules with the formula Pn_{2}O_{3} are generally considered as sesquioxides rather than sesquichalcogenides due to differing physical and chemical properties.

== Structure ==
Sesquichalcogenides have two main crystal structures: rhombohedral and orthorhombic.

== Properties ==
Sesquichalcogenides have been shown to possess piezoelectric properties with bismuth indium telluride (BiInTe_{3}) reported to have a piezoelectric coefficient of 362 pm V^{-1}, which is higher than many conventional materials, which makes them of interest for lead free piezoelectric devices.

== Examples ==
- Antimony triselenide - Sb_{2}Se_{3}
- Arsenic(III) telluride - As_{2}Te_{3}
- Arsenic triselenide - As_{2}Se_{3}
- Arsenic trisulfide - As_{2}S_{3}
- Bismuth selenide - Bi_{2}Se_{3}
- Bismuth telluride - Bi_{2}Te_{3}
