= Trisulfide =

Functional group

In organic and organometallic chemistry, trisulfide is the functional group R-S-S-S-R.

Examples include:

- Diallyl trisulfide
- Dimethyl trisulfide
- Trisulfane (hydrogen trisulfide)

Some inorganic compounds are also named trisulfides to reflect their stoichiometry.

Examples include:

- Antimony trisulfide
- Arsenic trisulfide
- Bismuth trisulfide
- Diboron trisulfide
- Diiron trisulfide
- Molybdenum trisulfide
- Phosphorus trisulfide

== See also ==
- Chalcogenide
  - Triselenide
- Disulfide
- Polysulfide
