= Antimony sulfide =

Antimony sulfide may refer to either of two compounds of antimony and sulfur:

- Antimony trisulfide, Sb_{2}S_{3}
- Antimony pentasulfide, Sb_{2}S_{5}, known as antimony red
