= Arsenic pentasulfide =

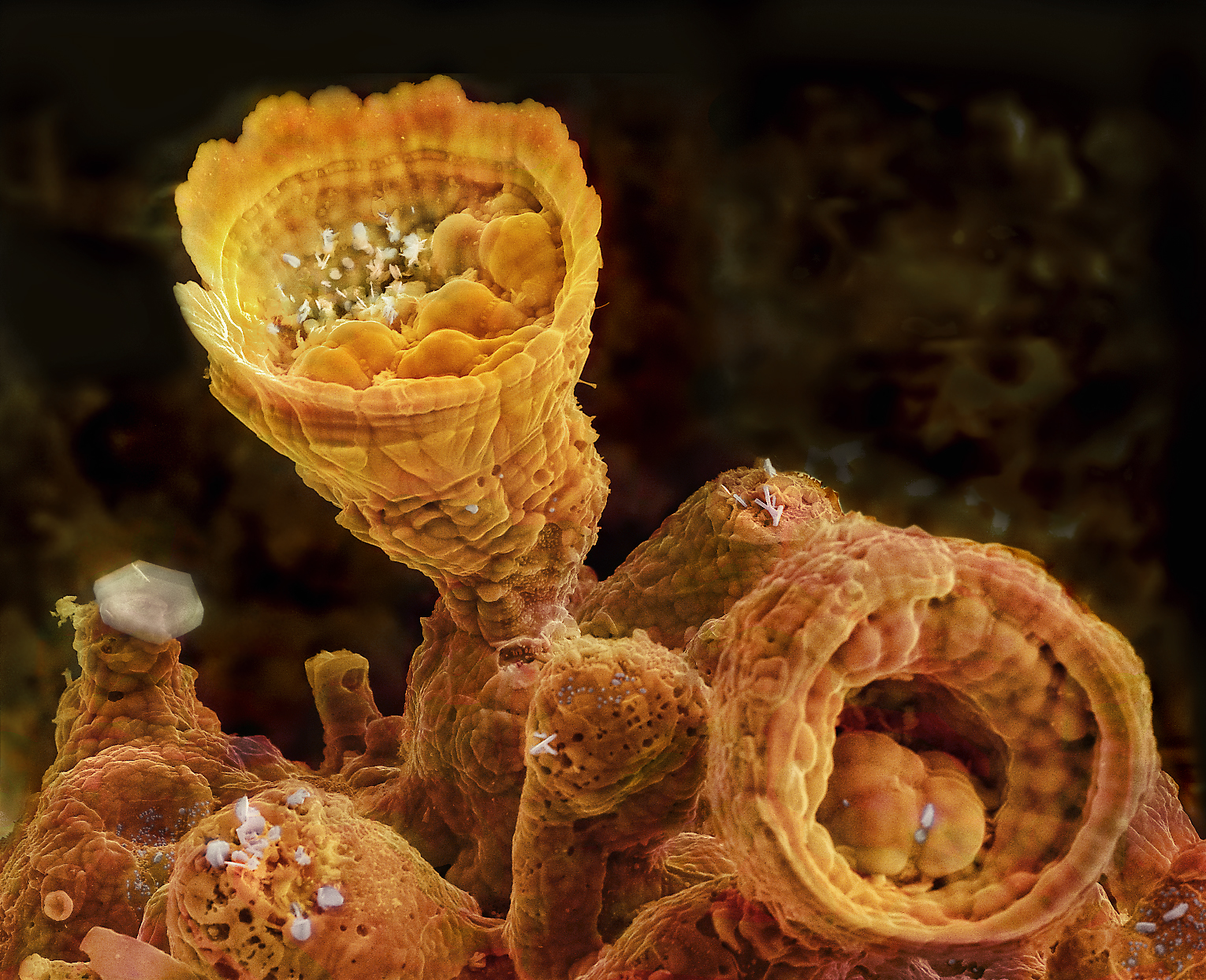
- An electron micrograph of arsenic pentasulfide in fumarolic incrustations of Mutnovsky volcano

Names
- IUPAC name Arsenic pentasulfide
- Other names: Arsenic(V) sulfide; Diarsenic pentasulfide

Identifiers
CAS Number	1303-34-0
3D model (JSmol)	Interactive image; Interactive image
ChemSpider	2617071
ECHA InfoCard	100.154.195
EC Number	625-728-1
PubChem CID	3371533
UNII	QT80493YBG
UN number	1557
CompTox Dashboard (EPA)	DTXSID0058302
- InChI: InChI=1S/As2S5/c3-1(4)7-2(5)6 Key: AYRZLUSHOXJGKY-UHFFFAOYSA-N; InChI=1S/As4S10/c5-1-9-2(6)12-3(7,10-1)14-4(8,11-1)13-2 Key: CHQYGMAMCBQSIU-UHFFFAOYSA-N
- SMILES: S=[As](=S)S[As](=S)=S; S=[As]12S[As]3(=S)S[As](=S)(S1)S[As](=S)(S2)S3

Properties
Chemical formula	As_{2}S_{5}
Molar mass	310.14 g·mol^{−1}
Appearance	Vivid, yellow, opaque crystals
Melting point	300 °C (572 °F; 573 K)(minimum)
Boiling point	500 °C (932 °F; 773 K)(decomposes)
Solubility in water	0.014 g/L (0 °C (32 °F; 273 K))

Hazards
- GHS labelling
Pictograms	(GHS06: Toxic) (GHS09: Environmental hazard)
Signal word	Danger
Hazard statements	H301, H331, H410
Precautionary statements	P261, P264, P270, P271, P273, P301+P310, P304+P340, P311, P321, P330, P391, P403+P233, P405, P501

Related compounds
Other anions	Antimony pentasulfide; Phosphorus pentasulfide
Other cations	Arsenic pentoxide; Arsenic trisulfide; Tetraarsenic tetrasulfide; Tetraarsenic trisulfide
- Except where otherwise noted, data are given for materials in their standard state (at 25 °C [77 °F], 100 kPa). verify (what is ?) Infobox references

Arsenic pentasulfide is an inorganic compound containing arsenic and sulfur. It has the approximate formula As_{2}S_{5}, and is a somewhat brighter yellow color than arsenic trisulfide.

== Uses ==
As_{2}S_{5} has been used as a pigment and chemical intermediate but is generally only of interest in academic laboratories.

== Preparation ==
Arsenic pentasulfide is prepared by precipitation from an acidic solution of soluble As(V) salts by treatment with hydrogen sulfide (H_{2}S).

A similar preparation is by treatment of an ice-cooled aqueous solution of orthoarsenic acid (H_{3}AsO_{4}) with twice its volume of concentrated hydrochloric acid, rapid bubbling of H_{2}S into the solution for an hour, followed by washing of the precipitate with water and alcohol:

2 H_{3}AsO_{4} + 5 H_{2}S → As_{2}S_{5} + 8 H_{2}O

It may be also prepared by heating a mixture of arsenic and sulfur, extracting the fused mass with an ammonia solution and reprecipitating arsenic pentasulfide at low temperature by addition of hydrochloric acid.

== Reactions ==
Arsenic pentasulfide decomposes to arsenic trioxide (As_{2}O_{3}), sulfur, and arsenic trisulfide (As_{2}S_{3}) when boiled in water.

It oxidizes in air at elevated temperatures producing arsenic oxides, the products and yields of which are variable. In alkali metal sulfide solutions arsenic pentasulfide forms a thioarsenate anion, [AsS_{4}]^{3−}, which contain As(V) centers.
