= Nicotinamide-nucleotide amidase =

Class of enzymes

Identifiers
- EC no.: 3.5.1.42
- CAS no.: 37355-58-1

Databases
- BRENDA: enzyme data
- ExPASy: NiceZyme view
- KEGG: enzyme entry
- MetaCyc: metabolic pathway
- Rhea: reactions
- PDB structures: RCSB PDB PDBe PDBsum
- Gene Ontology: AmiGO / QuickGO
Search
- PMC: articles
- PubMed: articles
- NCBI: proteins

Nicotinamide-nucleotide amidase (EC 3.5.1.42) is an enzyme that catalyzes the chemical reaction

nicotinamide mononucleotide
H_{2}O
NH_{3}
nicotinate mononucleotide

The enzyme characterised from Azotobacter vinelandii hydrolyses the nucleotide, nicotinamide mononucleotide, to give nicotinate mononucleotide and ammonia.

Manufacture of nicotinamide mononucleotide for use as a pharmaceutical drug has been studied and in this context its degradation by nicotinamide-nucleotide amidase is undesirable, so means to down-regulate the enzyme or remove its associated gene have been sought.

This enzyme is a hydrolase, one acting on carbon-nitrogen bonds other than peptide bonds, specifically in linear amides. The systematic name of this enzyme class is nicotinamide-D-ribonucleotide amidohydrolase. Other names in use include NMN deamidase, nicotinamide mononucleotide deamidase, and nicotinamide mononucleotide amidohydrolase.
