= Triselenide =

A triselenide is a compound or ion which contains three selenium atoms or ions. Some examples include:

- Arsenic triselenide - As_{2}Se_{3}
- Niobium triselenide - NbSe_{3}
- Antimony triselenide - Sb_{2}Se_{3}
- Gallium(III) selenide - Ga_{2}Se_{3}
