= Ammonium tetrathioarsenate =

Names
- Other names Ammonium tetrathioarsenate(V)

Identifiers
3D model (JSmol)	Interactive image
PubChem CID	139201059
- InChI: InChI=1S/AsH3S4.3H3N/c2-1(3,4)5;;;/h(H3,2,3,4,5);3*1H3 Key: GSMYPRXQFWJICA-UHFFFAOYSA-N
- SMILES: [NH4+].[NH4+].[NH4+].[S-][As](=S)([S-])[S-]

Properties
Chemical formula	AsH_{12}N_{3}S_{4}
Molar mass	257.28 g·mol^{−1}
Appearance	colorless crystals
- Except where otherwise noted, data are given for materials in their standard state (at 25 °C [77 °F], 100 kPa). Infobox references

Ammonium tetrathioarsenate is a chemical compound with the chemical formula (NH_{4})_{3}AsS_{4}.

== Synthesis ==
Reaction of arsenic trisulfide with yellow ammonium sulphide:

As_{2}S_{3} + 3(NH_{4})_{2}S + 2S → 2(NH_{4})_{3}AsS_{4}

== Physical properties ==
Ammonium tetrathioarsenate forms colorless crystals of orthorhombic system, spatial group Pcmn.
