= Galkhaite =

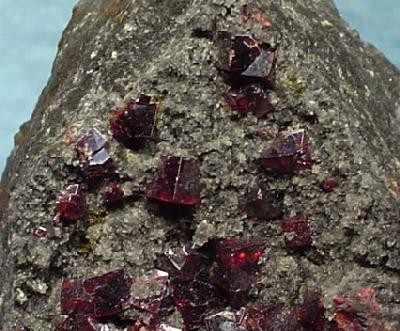
- Galkhaite crystals to 3 mm on matrix, Getchell Mine, Nevada.

General
- Category: Sulfosalt minerals
- Formula: (Cs,Tl)(Hg,Cu,Zn)_{6}(As,Sb)_{4}S_{12}
- IMA symbol: Gkh
- Strunz classification: 2.GB.20
- Crystal system: Cubic
- Crystal class: Hextetrahedral (4̅3m); H-M symbol: (4̅ 3m)
- Space group: I4̅3m

Galkhaite is a rare and chemically complex sulfosalt mineral from a group of natural thioarsenites. Its formula is (Cs,Tl)(Hg,Cu,Zn)_{6}(As,Sb)_{4}S_{12}, making the mineral the only known natural Cs-Hg and Cs-As phase. It occurs in Carlin-type hydrothermal deposits.
