= Automotive thermoelectric generator =

Waste heat recovery device in an engine

An automotive thermoelectric generator (ATEG) is a device that converts some of the waste heat of an internal combustion engine (ICE) into electricity using the Seebeck Effect. A typical ATEG consists of four main elements: A hot-side heat exchanger, a cold-side heat exchanger, thermoelectric materials, and a compression assembly system. ATEGs can convert waste heat from an engine's coolant or exhaust into electricity. By reclaiming this otherwise lost energy, ATEGs decrease fuel consumed by the electric generator load on the engine. However, the cost of the unit and the extra fuel consumed due to its weight must be also considered.

== Operation principles ==
In ATEGs, thermoelectric materials are packed between the hot-side and the cold-side heat exchangers. The thermoelectric materials are made up of p-type and n-type semiconductors, while the heat exchangers are metal plates with high thermal conductivity.

The temperature difference between the two surfaces of the thermoelectric module(s) generates electricity using the Seebeck Effect. When hot exhaust from the engine passes through an exhaust ATEG, the charge carriers of the semiconductors within the generator diffuse from the hot-side heat exchanger to the cold-side exchanger. The build-up of charge carriers results in a net charge, producing an electrostatic potential while the heat transfer drives a current. With exhaust temperatures of 700 °C (≈1300 °F) or more, the temperature difference between exhaust gas on the hot side and coolant on the cold side is several hundred degrees. This temperature difference is capable of generating 500-750 W of electricity.

The compression assembly system aims to decrease the thermal contact resistance between the thermoelectric module and the heat exchanger surfaces. In coolant-based ATEGs, the cold side heat exchanger uses engine coolant as the cooling fluid, while in exhaust-based ATEGs, the cold-side heat exchanger uses ambient air as the cooling fluid.

== Efficiency ==
Currently, ATEGs are about 5% efficient. However, advancements in thin-film and quantum well technologies could increase efficiency up to 15% in the future.

The efficiency of an ATEG is governed by the thermoelectric conversion efficiency of the materials and the thermal efficiency of the two heat exchangers. The ATEG efficiency can be expressed as:

Ζ_{OV} = ζ_{CONV} х ζ_{HX} х ρ

Where:

- Ζ_{OV} : The overall efficiency of the ATEG
- Ζ_{CONV} : Conversion efficiency of thermoelectric materials
- Ζ_{HX}: Efficiency of the heat exchangers
- Ρ : The ratio between the heat passed through thermoelectric materials to that passed from the hot side to the cold side

== Benefits ==
The primary goal of ATEGs is to reduce fuel consumption and therefore reduce operating costs of a vehicle or help the vehicle comply with fuel efficiency standards. Forty percent of an ICE's energy is lost through exhaust gas heat. Implementing ATEGs in diesel engines seems to be more challenging compared to gasoline engines due to lower exhaust temperature and higher mass-flow rates. This is the reason most ATEG development has been focused on gasoline engines. However, there exist several ATEG designs for light-duty and heavy-duty diesel engines.

By converting the lost heat into electricity, ATEGs decrease fuel consumption by reducing the electric generator load on the engine. ATEGs allow the automobile to generate electricity from the engine's thermal energy rather than using mechanical energy to power an electric generator. Since the electricity is generated from waste heat that would otherwise be released into the environment, the engine burns less fuel to power the vehicle's electrical components, such as the headlights. Therefore, the automobile releases fewer emissions.

Decreased fuel consumption also results in increased fuel economy. Replacing the conventional electric generator with ATEGs could ultimately increase the fuel economy by up to 4%.

The ATEG's ability to generate electricity without moving parts is an advantage over mechanical electric generators alternatives. In addition, it has been stated that for low power engine conditions, ATEGs may be able to harvest more net energy than electric turbogenerators.

== Challenges ==
The greatest challenge to the scaling of ATEGs from prototyping to production has been the cost of the underlying thermoelectric materials. Since the early-2000s, many research agencies and institutions poured large sums of money into advancing the efficiency of thermoelectric materials. While efficiency improvements were made in materials such as the half heuslers and skutterudites, like their predecessors bismuth telluride and lead telluride, the cost of these materials has proven prohibitive for large-scale manufacturing. Recent advances by some researchers and companies in low-cost thermoelectric materials have resulted in significant commercial promise for ATEGs, most notably the low-cost production of tetrahedrite by Michigan State University and its commercialization by US-based Alphabet Energy with General Motors.

Like any new component on an automobile, the use of an ATEG presents new engineering problems to consider, as well. However, given an ATEG's relatively low impact on the use of an automobile, its challenges are not as considerable as other new automotive technologies. For instance, since exhaust has to flow through the ATEG's heat exchanger, kinetic energy from the gas is lost, causing increased pumping losses. This is referred to as back pressure, which reduces the engine's performance. This can be accounted for by downsizing the muffler, resulting in zero net or even negative total back-pressure on the engine, as Faurecia and other companies have shown.

To make the ATEG's efficiency more consistent, coolant is usually used on the cold-side heat exchanger rather than ambient air so that the temperature difference will be the same on both hot and cold days. This may increase the radiator's size since piping must be extended to the exhaust manifold, and it may add to the radiator's load because there is more heat being transferred to the coolant. Proper thermal design does not require an upsized cooling system.

The added weight of ATEGs causes the engine to work harder, resulting in lower gas mileage. Most automotive efficiency improvement studies of ATEGs, however, have resulted in a net positive efficiency gain even when considering the weight of the device.

== History ==
Although the Seebeck effect was discovered in 1821, the use of thermoelectric power generators was restricted mainly to military and space applications until the second half of the twentieth century. This restriction was caused by the low conversion efficiency of thermoelectric materials at that time.

In 1963, the first ATEG was built and reported by Neild et al. In 1988, Birkholz et al. published the results of their work in collaboration with Porsche. These results described an exhaust-based ATEG which integrated iron-based thermoelectric materials between a carbon steel hot-side heat exchanger and an aluminium cold-side heat exchanger. This ATEG could produce tens of watts out of a Porsche 944 exhaust system.

In the early 1990s, Hi-Z Inc designed an ATEG which could produce 1 kW from a diesel truck exhaust system. The company in the following years introduced other designs for diesel trucks as well as military vehicles

In the late 1990s, Nissan Motors published the results of testing its ATEG which utilized SiGe thermoelectric materials. Nissan ATEG produced 35.6 W in testing conditions similar to the running conditions of a 3.0 L gasoline engine in hill-climb mode at 60.0 km/h.

Since the early-2000s, nearly every major automaker and exhaust supplier has experimented or studied thermoelectric generators, and companies including General Motors, BMW, Daimler, Ford, Renault, Honda, Toyota, Hyundai, Valeo, Boysen, Faurecia, Tenneco, Denso, Gentherm Inc., Alphabet Energy, and numerous others have built and tested prototypes.

In January 2012, Car and Driver named an ATEG created by a team led by Amerigon (now Gentherm Incorporated) one of the 10 "most promising" technologies.
