= Sodium thioantimoniate =

- Sodium thioantimoniate

Names
- IUPAC name Sodium tetrathioantimonate(V)

Identifiers
CAS Number	10101-91-4 (nonahydrate)
3D model (JSmol)	(nonahydrate): Interactive image
ChemSpider	34995828 (nonahydrate)
ECHA InfoCard	100.208.207
EC Number	682-752-5 (nonahydrate)
PubChem CID	71312650 (nonahydrate)
UNII	ZLI1AS68EX (nonahydrate)
CompTox Dashboard (EPA)	DTXSID00746895; (nonahydrate)
- InChI: InChI=1S/3Na.9H2O.4S.Sb/h;;;9*1H2;;;;;/q3*+1;;;;;;;;;;;3*-1; Key: ZHSCVFVPXYYCAW-UHFFFAOYSA-N
- SMILES: (nonahydrate): O.O.O.O.O.O.O.O.O.[Na+].[Na+].[Na+].[S-][Sb](=S)([S-])[S-]

Properties
Chemical formula	Na_{3}SbS_{4} (anhydrous); Na_{3}SbS_{4}·9H_{2}O (nonahydrate)
Molar mass	272.13 g·mol^{−1} (anhydrous); 434.27 g·mol^{−1} (nonahydrate)
Appearance	Yellow crystals
Density	1.806 g/cm^{3}, solid
Melting point	87 °C (189 °F; 360 K)

Hazards
- GHS labelling
Pictograms	(GHS07: Exclamation mark) (GHS09: Environmental hazard)
Signal word	Warning
Hazard statements	H302, H332, H411
Precautionary statements	P261, P264, P270, P271, P273, P301+P312, P304+P312, P304+P340, P312, P330, P391, P501

Related compounds
Other cations	Potassium thioantimoniate
Related compounds	Antimony(III) sulfide
- Except where otherwise noted, data are given for materials in their standard state (at 25 °C [77 °F], 100 kPa). verify (what is ?) Infobox references

Sodium thioantimoniate or sodium tetrathioantimonate(V) is an inorganic compound with the formula Na_{3}SbS_{4}. The nonahydrate of this chemical, Na_{3}SbS_{4}·9H_{2}O, is known as Schlippe's salt, named after Johann Karl Friedrich von Schlippe (1799–1867). These compounds are examples of sulfosalts. They were once of interest as species generated in qualitative inorganic analysis.

== Structure ==
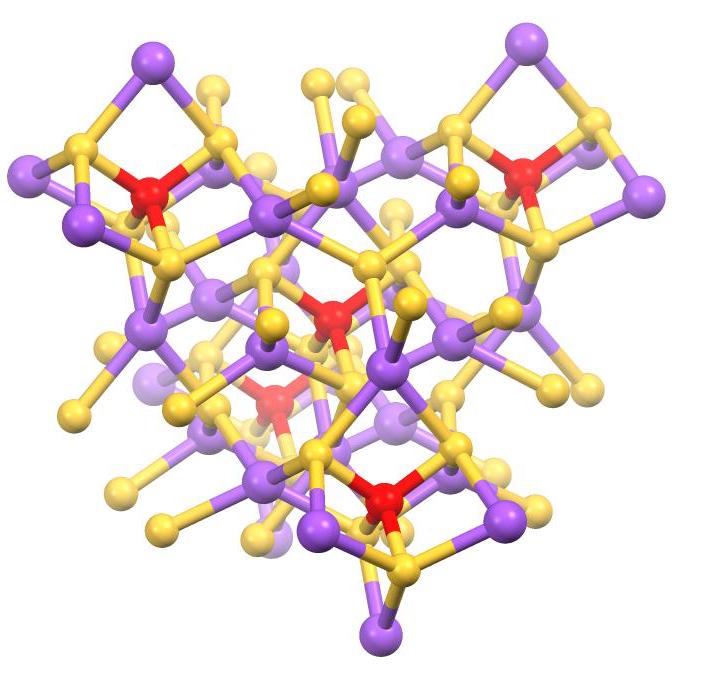
Anhydrous NaSbS_{3} has a complicated structure featuring SbS_{4}^{−} tetrahedra interconnected by Na-S bonds. Color scheme: red = Sb, yellow = S, violet = Na.

The nonahydrate consists of the tetrahedral tetrathioantimonate(V) anions SbS^{3−}_{4} and sodium cations Na^{+}, which are hydrated. The Sb-S distance is 2.33 Å. Related salts are known for different cations including ammonium and potassium.

The anhydrous salt is a polymer with tetrahedral Na and Sb sites.

== Preparation ==
Sodium tetrathioantimonate nonahydrate is prepared by the reaction of "antimony trisulfide", elemental sulfur, and aqueous sulfide source.

3 Na_{2}S + 2 S + Sb_{2}S_{3} + 18 H_{2}O → 2 Na_{3}SbS_{4}·9H_{2}O

The Na_{2}S can be generated in situ by the reaction of sodium hydroxide and S (co-generating sodium sulfate):

Sb_{2}S_{3} + 8 NaOH + 6 S → 2 Na_{3}SbS_{4} + Na_{2}SO_{4} + 4 H_{2}O

Charcoal can also be used to reduce the sulfur.

The required antimony trisulfide is prepared by treatment of Sb(III) compounds with sulfide sources:

2 SbCl_{3} + 3 H_{2}S → Sb_{2}S_{3} + 6 HCl

== Reactions ==
The hydrate dissolves in water to give the tetrahedral SbS^{3−}_{4} ion. The salt gives antimony pentasulfide upon acidification:

2 Na_{3}SbS_{4} + 6 HCl → Sb_{2}S_{5} + 6 NaCl + 3 H_{2}S
