= Antimony telluride =

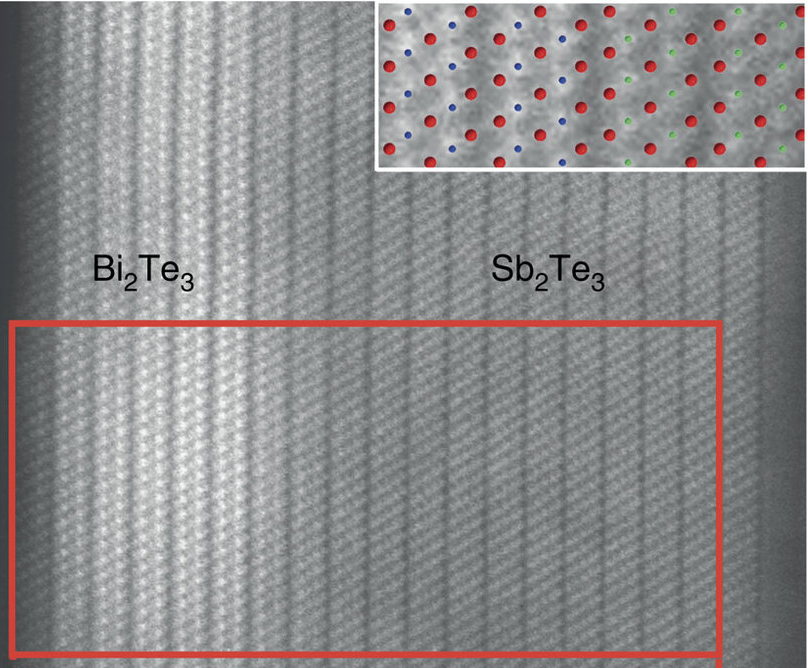
- Electron micrograph of a seamless Bi_{2}Te_{3}/Sb_{2}Te_{3} heterojunction and its atomic model (blue: Bi, green: Sb, red: Te)

Names
- Other names antimony telluride, antimony(III) telluride, antimony telluride, diantimony tritelluride

Identifiers
CAS Number	1327-50-0
3D model (JSmol)	Interactive image; Interactive image
ChemSpider	21241420
ECHA InfoCard	100.014.074
PubChem CID	6369653
- InChI: InChI=1S/2Sb.3Te/q2*+3;3*-2 Key: RSPNQEPAQCYWKS-UHFFFAOYSA-N; InChI=1/2Sb.3Te/q2*+3;3*-2 Key: RSPNQEPAQCYWKS-UHFFFAOYAT
- SMILES: [Te]=[Sb][Te][Sb]=[Te]; [Sb+3].[Sb+3].[Te-2].[Te-2].[Te-2]

Properties
Chemical formula	Sb_{2}Te_{3}
Molar mass	626.32 g·mol^{−1}
Appearance	grey solid
Density	6.50 g cm^{−3}
Melting point	620 °C (1,148 °F; 893 K)
Band gap	0.21 eV
Thermal conductivity	1.65 W/(m·K) (308 K)

Structure
Crystal structure	Rhombohedral, hR15
Space group	R3̅m, No. 166
Lattice constant	a = 0.4262 nm, c = 3.0435 nm
Formula units (Z)	3

Hazards
- NIOSH (US health exposure limits)
PEL (Permissible)	TWA 0.5 mg/m^{3} (as Sb)
REL (Recommended)	TWA 0.5 mg/m^{3} (as Sb)

Related compounds
Other anions	Sb_{2}O_{3} Sb_{2}S_{3} Sb_{2}Se_{3}
Other cations	As_{2}Te_{3} Bi_{2}Te_{3}
- Except where otherwise noted, data are given for materials in their standard state (at 25 °C [77 °F], 100 kPa). verify (what is ?) Infobox references

Antimony telluride is an inorganic compound with the chemical formula Sb_{2}Te_{3}. As is true of other pnictogen chalcogenide layered materials, it is a grey crystalline solid with layered structure. Layers consist of two atomic sheets of antimony and three atomic sheets of tellurium and are held together by weak van der Waals forces. Sb_{2}Te_{3} is a narrow-gap semiconductor with a band gap 0.21 eV; it is also a topological insulator, and thus exhibits thickness-dependent physical properties.

== Crystalline structure ==
Sb_{2}Te_{3} has a rhombohedral crystalline structure. The crystalline material comprises atoms covalently bonded to form 5 atom thick sheets (in order: Te-Sb-Te-Sb-Te), with sheets held together by van der Waals attraction. Due to its layered structure and weak inter-layer forces, bulk antimony telluride may be mechanically exfoliated to isolate single sheets.

== Synthesis ==
Although antimony telluride is a naturally occurring compound, select stoichiometric compounds may be formed by the reaction of antimony with tellurium at 500–900 °C.

2 Sb(l) + 3 Te(l) → Sb_{2}Te_{3}(l)

== Applications ==
Like other binary chalcogenides of antimony and bismuth, Sb_{2}Te_{3} has been investigated for its semiconductor properties. It can be transformed into both n-type and p-type semiconductors by doping with an appropriate dopant.

Doping Sb_{2}Te_{3} with iron introduces multiple Fermi pockets, in contrast to the single frequency detected for pure Sb_{2}Te_{3}, and results in reduced carrier density and mobility.

Sb_{2}Te_{3} forms the pseudobinary intermetallic system germanium-antimony-tellurium with germanium telluride, GeTe.

Like bismuth telluride, Bi_{2}Te_{3}, antimony telluride has a large thermoelectric effect and is therefore used in solid state refrigerators.
