= Azotobacter vinelandii =

Scientific classification
- Domain: Bacteria
- Kingdom: Pseudomonadati
- Phylum: Pseudomonadota
- Class: Gammaproteobacteria
- Order: Pseudomonadales
- Family: Pseudomonadaceae
- Genus: Azotobacter
- Species: A. vinelandii

Binomial name
- Azotobacter vinelandii Lipman 1903

Species of bacterium

Azotobacter vinelandii is Gram-negative diazotroph that can fix nitrogen while grown aerobically. These bacteria are easily cultured and grown.

A. vinelandii is a free-living N_{2} fixer known to produce many phytohormones and vitamins in soils. It produces fluorescent pyoverdine pigments.

== Nitrogenase ==
The nitrogenase holoenzyme of A. vinelandii has been characterised by X-ray crystallography in both ADP tetrafluoroaluminate-bound and MgATP-bound states. The enzyme possesses molybdenum iron-sulfido cluster cofactors (FeMoco) as active sites, each bearing two pseudocubic iron-sulfido structures.

== Applications ==
It is a genetically tractable system that is used to study nitrogen fixation.

Genetically engineered strains can produce significantly higher amounts of ammonia. Appropriate ammonia emissions can provide crops with the ammonia they need without excess amounts that can pollute lakes and oceans.

A. vinelandii also produces significant amounts of alginate.

== Variable ploidy ==
A. vinelandii can contain up to 80 chromosome copies per cell. However this is only seen in fast growing culture, whereas cultures grown in synthetic minimal media are not polyploid.
