= Bismuth selenide =

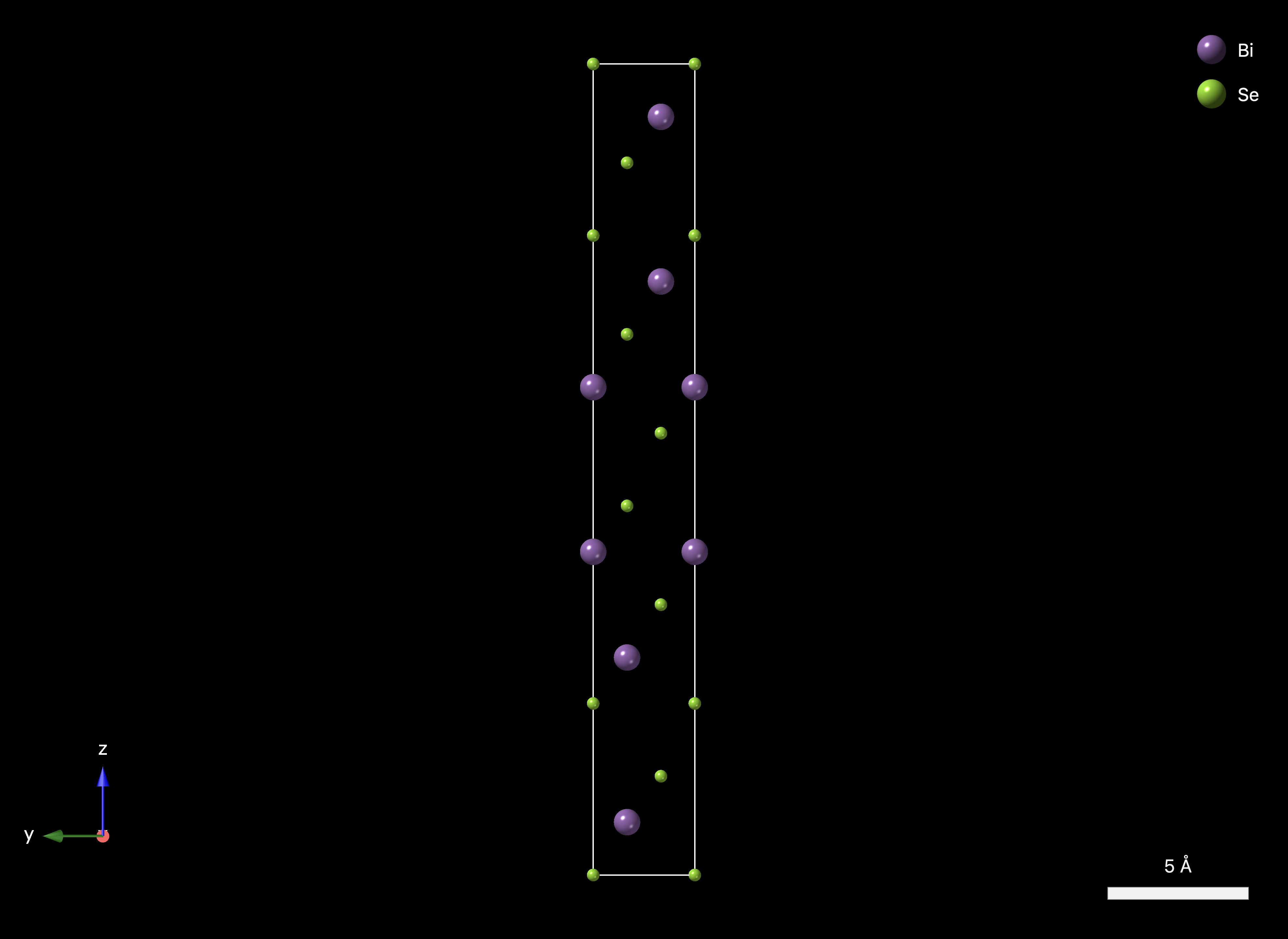
- A diagram of the crystal structure of bismuth selenide (viewed along the a axis)

Names
- IUPAC name selenoxobismuth, selanylidenebismuth

Identifiers
| CAS Number | 12068-69-8 |
| 3D model (JSmol) | Interactive image |
| ChemSpider | 145787 |
| ECHA InfoCard | 100.031.901 |
| EC Number | 235-104-7 |
| PubChem CID | 6379269 |
| UNII | 9I1Y040903 |
| CompTox Dashboard (EPA) | DTXSID60893213 |
- InChI: InChI=1S/2Bi.3Se Key: OMEPJWROJCQMMU-UHFFFAOYSA-N
- SMILES: [Se-2].[Se-2].[Se-2].[Bi+3].[Bi+3]

Properties
| Chemical formula | Bi_{2}Se_{3} |
| Molar mass | 654.8 g/mol |
| Appearance | Dull grey |
| Density | 6.82 g/cm^{3} |
| Melting point | 710 °C (1,310 °F; 983 K) |
| Solubility in water | insoluble |
| Solubility | insoluble in organic solvents soluble in strong acids |

Structure
| Crystal structure | rhombohedral |

Thermochemistry
| Std enthalpy of formation (Δ_{f}H^{⦵}_{298}) | −140 kJ/mol |

Hazards
- Occupational safety and health (OHS/OSH)
| Main hazards | Toxic |
| NFPA 704 (fire diamond) | 2 0 0 |

Related compounds
| Other anions | Bismuth(III) oxide Bismuth trisulfide Bismuth telluride |
| Other cations | Arsenic triselenide Antimony triselenide |
- Except where otherwise noted, data are given for materials in their standard state (at 25 °C [77 °F], 100 kPa). verify (what is ?) Infobox references

Bismuth selenide (Bi_{2}Se_{3}) is a gray compound of bismuth and selenium also known as bismuth(III) selenide.

Its crystal structure is found to have the space group R3̅m (No.166) with lattice parameters a = 4.143 Å and c = 28.636 Å.

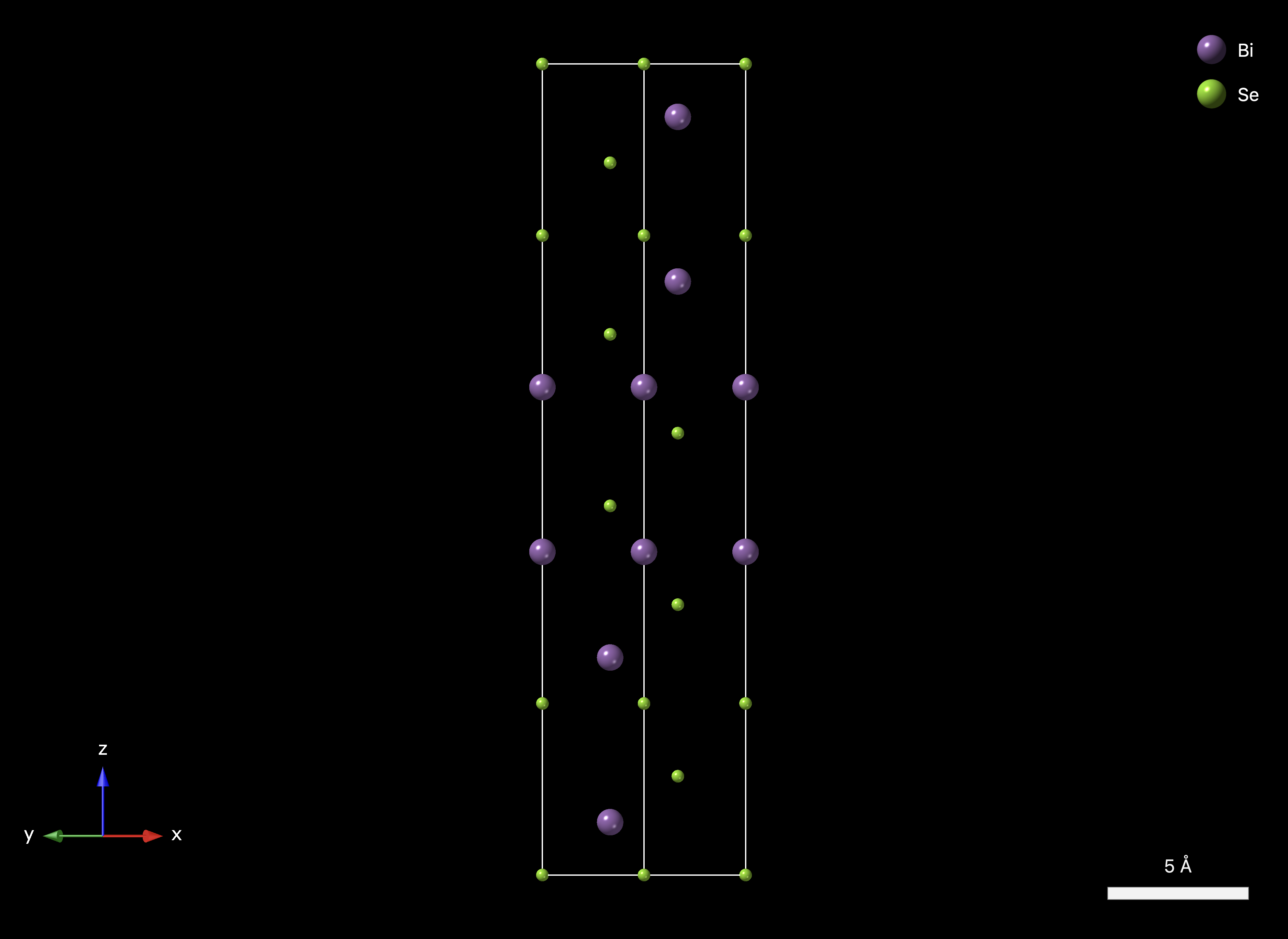
Crystal structure of bismuth selenide (viewed along the [110] direction)

== Properties ==
Bismuth selenide is a semiconductor and a thermoelectric material. While stoichiometric bismuth selenide should be a semiconductor with a gap of 0.3 eV, naturally occurring selenium vacancies act as electron donors, so Bi_{2}Se_{3} is intrinsically n-type.

Bismuth selenide has a topologically insulating ground-state. Topologically protected Dirac cone surface states have been observed in Bismuth selenide and its insulating derivatives leading to intrinsic topological insulators, which later became the subject of world-wide scientific research.

Bismuth selenide is a van der Waals material consisting of covalently bound five-atom layers (quintuple layers) which are held together by van der Waals interactions and spin-orbit coupling effects. Although the (0001) surface is chemically inert (mostly due to the inert-pair effect of Bi), there are metallic surface states, protected by the non-trivial topology of the bulk. For this reason, the Bi_{2}Se_{3} surface is an interesting candidate for van der Waals epitaxy and subject of scientific research. For instance, different phases of antimony layers can be grown on Bi_{2}Se_{3}, by means of which topological pn-junctions can be realised. More intriguingly, Sb layers undergo topological phase transitions when attached to the Bi_{2}Se_{3} surface and thus inherit the non-trivial topological properties of the Bi_{2}Se_{3} substrate.

== Production ==
Although bismuth selenide occurs naturally (as the mineral guanajuatite) at the Santa Catarina Mine in Guanajuato, Mexico as well as some sites in the United States and Europe, such deposits are rare and contain a significant level of sulfur atoms as an impurity. For this reason, most bismuth selenide used in research into potential commercial applications is synthesized. Commercially-produced samples are available for use in research, but the concentration of selenium vacancies is heavily dependent upon growth conditions, and so bismuth selenide used for research is often synthesized in the laboratory.

A stoichiometric mixture of elemental bismuth and selenium, when heated above the melting points of these elements in the absence of air, will become a liquid that freezes to crystalline Bi_{2}Se_{3}. Large single crystals of bismuth selenide can be prepared by the Bridgman–Stockbarger method.

== See also ==
- Thermoelectric materials
- Thermoelectric effect
- Topological insulators
