= Thermoelectric battery =

Battery charged by converting heat into chemical energy

A thermoelectric battery stores energy when charged by converting heat into chemical energy and produces electricity when discharged. Such systems potentially offer an alternative means of disposing of waste heat from plants that burn fossil fuels and/or nuclear energy.

== History ==
Thomas Johann Seebeck (1780–1831) discovered the thermoelectric effect in 1821. The symmetrical Peltier effect (Jean Charles Athanse Peltier, 1785–1845) uses an electric current to produce temperature differences. In the middle part of the twentieth century the thermo-electric generator was often used in place of galvanic batteries.

== Copper/ammonia ==
In 2014 researchers demonstrated a prototype system that uses copper electrodes and ammonia as the electrolyte. The device converted some 29 percent of the battery's chemical energy into electricity.

The ammonia electrolyte is only used as an anolyte (electrolyte surrounding an anode) that reacts with the copper electrode as waste heat warms the ammonia, generating electricity. When the reaction uses up the ammonia or depletes the copper ions in the electrolyte near the cathode the reaction stops.

Waste heat then is used to distill the ammonia from the used anolyte. The ammonia is then added to the cathode chamber. The battery's polarity reverses and the anode becomes the cathode and vice versa.

The system's power density was some maximum power density of 60+-3 1 W m^{−2}(based on a single electrode), with a maximum energy density of 453 W h m^{−3}(normalized to the electrolyte volume), substantially higher than that of other liquid-centered thermal-electrics. Power density increased with the number of batteries in the system.

Volatilization of ammonia from the spent anolyte by heating (simulating distillation), and re-addition of this ammonia to the spent catholyte chamber with subsequent operation of this chamber as the anode (to regenerate copper on the other electrode), produced a maximum power density of 60 ± 3 W m^{−2}, with an average discharge energy efficiency of 29% (electrical energy captured versus chemical energy in the starting solutions). An acid added to the catholyte increased power 126 ± 5 W m^{−2}.

== Telluride ==
Telluride based batteries convert 15 to 20 percent of heat to energy.

== Fulvalene diruthenium ==
Fulvalene diruthenium promises greater efficiency, but is too expensive for commercial use.

== See also ==
- COGAS
- Thermoelectric generator
