= Stove fan =

A stove fan is a fan which is placed on top of a heating stove to circulate air and improve efficiency. They are typically powered by the heat of the stove itself, mostly using a thermoelectric generator but sometimes a Stirling engine.
