= Gentherm Incorporated =

American thermal management technologies company

- Formerly: Amerigon
- Type: Incorporated
- Traded as: Nasdaq: THRM; S&P 600 component
- Industry: Industrial Manufacturing
- Founded: 1991; 35 years ago in California (as Amerigon); 2012; 14 years ago (as Gentherm, Inc.)
- Headquarters: Novi, Michigan, U.S.
- Number of locations: 45+ (2026)
- Area served: Worldwide
- Products: Climate control seat; Medical devices; Electronics
- Revenue: ▲USD $985.683 million (2017); $917.600 million (2016)
- Number of employees: 18,000+ (2026)
- Subsidiaries: Etratech; Cincinnati Sub-Zero; Gentherm Global Power Technologies
- Website: www.gentherm.com

Gentherm Incorporated, formerly Amerigon, is an American thermal management technologies company. Gentherm created the first thermoelectrically heated and cooled seat system for the automotive industry. Called the "Climate Control Seat" system, it was first adopted by the Ford Motor Company and introduced as an option on the model year 2000 Lincoln Navigator in 1999. Today it is available on more than 50 vehicles sold by Ford, General Motors, Toyota (Lexus), Kia, Hyundai, Nissan (Infiniti), Range Rover and Jaguar Land Rover.

Currently, the company is a developer and marketer of thermal management technologies for heating and cooling and temperature control devices for a variety of industries.

Gentherm is publicly traded on Nasdaq under the symbol THRM and is headquartered in Novi, MI. Gentherm's thermoelectric technologies are based on the Peltier Effect, the 1834 discovery that passing an electric current through a sandwich of two dissimilar metals will make them hot on one side and cold (the lack of heat) on the other.

== History ==
Since 2005, Gentherm has been partnering with BMW and Ford on a project that is backed by the U.S. Department of Energy focused on the development of an automotive thermoelectric generator (ATEG) that converts waste exhaust heat into electrical power based on the Seebeck Effect. A prototype of the ATEG was named one of the most promising innovations for 2012 by Car and Driver magazine.

Amerigon, the precursor company to Gentherm, had been formed in 1991 by Lon E. Bell in Monrovia, California, focusing on automotive technologies and electric vehicles. In 1999, the company introduced the first thermoelectric Climate Control Seat (CCS) for the MY 2000 Lincoln Navigator, and in 2005, the company relocated from California to Northville, Michigan. In 2008, Amerigon acquired Comair Rotron Shanghai; in 2011, they acquired a majority stake in W.E.T. Automotive Systems, a manufacturer of thermal comfort products. Amerigon Incorporated officially changed its name to Gentherm Incorporated on June 13, 2012. The company's NASDAQ trading symbol changed from "ARGN" to "THRM" simultaneously. The rebranding reflected the company's focus on its thermal management technologies.

Gentherm has over 18,000 employees in 45+ locations in 17 countries.

== Climate Control Seat ==
As with the MY 2008 Lincoln MKZ, the climate controlled front seats, heated and cooled, are user-controlled by individual dash-mounted switches. Ambient cabin air was drawn into the system and either heated or cooled by a solid-state heat pump, using a thermo-electric device (TED) to convert electric current into the desired hot or cold thermal effect.
