= Arsenic(III) telluride =

Names
- IUPAC name Arsenic(III) telluride
- Other names Arsenic telluride

Identifiers
CAS Number	12044-54-1
3D model (JSmol)	Interactive image
ChemSpider	22797844
ECHA InfoCard	100.031.765
EC Number	234-955-1
PubChem CID	6336551
CompTox Dashboard (EPA)	DTXSID001014262
- InChI: InChI=1S/2As.3Te Key: KOOQXSDVIQPGQD-UHFFFAOYSA-N
- SMILES: [As].[As].[Te].[Te].[Te]

Properties
Chemical formula	As_{2}Te_{3}
Molar mass	532.64 g·mol^{−1}

Structure
Crystal structure	Monoclinic
Space group	C2/m
Lattice constant	a = 14.339 Å, b = 4.006 Å, c = 9.873 Å α = 90°, β = 95°, γ = 90°
Lattice volume (V)	564.96
Formula units (Z)	4

Hazards
- GHS labelling
Pictograms	(GHS06: Toxic) (GHS09: Environmental hazard)
Signal word	Danger
Hazard statements	H301, H331, H410
Precautionary statements	P261, P264, P270, P271, P273, P301+P310, P304+P340, P311, P321, P330, P391, P403+P233, P405, P501

Related compounds
Other anions	Arsenic trioxide Arsenic trisulfide Arsenic triselenide
Other cations	Antimony telluride Bismuth telluride
- Except where otherwise noted, data are given for materials in their standard state (at 25 °C [77 °F], 100 kPa). Infobox references

Arsenic(III) telluride is an inorganic compound of arsenic and tellurium with the chemical formula As_{2}Te_{3}. It exists in two forms, the monoclinic α phase which transforms under high pressure to a rhombohedral β phase. The compound is a semiconductor, with most current carried by holes. Arsenic telluride has been examined for its use in nonlinear optics.

== Molecular and crystal structure ==
Arsenic(III) telluride is a bulk form of group 15 sesquichalcogenides which form chains of As_{2}Te_{3} molecules that are eventually stacked on top of each other and held together by weak Van der Waals forces. This stacking of long branches of As_{2}Te_{3} molecules gives arsenic(III) telluride an amorphous crystalline structure that can be found in the ɑ-As_{2}Te_{3} and β-As_{2}Te_{3} configurations at different pressures. At ambient pressure, ɑ-As_{2}Te_{3} yields a monoclinic structure with low thermoelectric properties; however, when placed in high pressure environments, ɑ-As_{2}Te_{3} transforms into the β-As_{2}Te_{3} configuration that has a rhombohedral R3m space group with high thermoelectric properties.

As_{2}Te_{3} is a semiconductor and has been used to study nonlinear optics due to its ability to conduct electrical current; however, at high temperatures when doped with impurities causes these conductive abilities to transform irreversibly from its traditional semiconductor ability to metal conduction only. This irreversible transformation is most likely caused by the doping materials added to As_{2}Te_{3} forming impurity clusters which causes an increase in paramagnetic tendency of the complex.

== Applications in nonlinear optics ==
As_{2}Te_{3} is the least studied amorphous chalcogenide compound, which are a group of semiconductors primarily used in nonlinear optics as glasses or lenses to redistribute light. It has not been studied widely due to the difficulty to synthesize As_{2}Te_{3} into amorphous crystalline solids. In order to avoid crystalizing arsenic telluride, it must be quenched quickly after it comes out of the melt. Arsenic telluride and As_{2}Te_{3} containing materials are starting to increase in popularity in the field of nonlinear optics because the amorphous glasses As_{2}Te_{3} is exceptional at redistributing the electrical charge density of the light source (typically a laser) when it interacts within the medium. The significance of this redistribution is that it allows for the modification of the laser’s nature to perform a specific function. Some examples of this are the use of lasers in sensors, optical communication systems, as well as changing the color of the laser for equipment and other machinery used in materials research.

It has also been discovered in recent studies that As_{2}Te_{3} presents mobility edges, which are edges surrounding a conductive gap, regardless of temperature allowing for the amorphous structure to conduct electricity at greater rates than expected. Due to this, it can be hypothesized that the mobility edges lie between delocalized and localized states as well as having a more energetically efficient transition from dark mobility to photoconductive mobility than other amorphous glasses.

== Semiconductor ==
Arsenic(III) telluride, in its doped crystalline form, houses electron carriers that are caused by doping impurities that sit close to the edge due to the relatively free electron density around the edges. These relatively free electrons interact with the impurities causing a decrease in electron density around the edge which causes a “tail” to form. These band tails overlap causing a gap or a hole, similar to p-type doping, that can be used for conduction; however, the mobility of the carriers in the lattice decreases significantly near the Fermi level of the two tails. This indicates that electronic stimuli, usually phonon related, is needed to induce hopping of electrons into the gap to cause conduction. The need of external phonon stimuli to cause electrical conductivity of As_{2}Te_{3} crystals further supports the effectiveness of As_{2}Te_{3} or As_{2}Te_{3} based glasses in the use of nonlinear optics because the light upon entering the lattice causes the electron hopping inducing conduction. Since the electrons are hopping into the conductance gap near the Fermi level, the light is being modified and will exit the lattice in a different form than it entered.
