= Trithioarsenite =

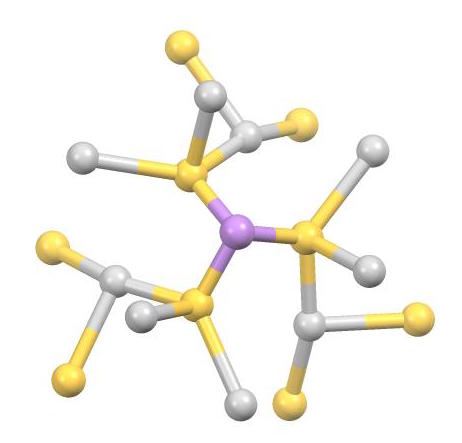
Subunit of the structure of proustite, a sulfosalt mineral. This picture shows the connectivity of the trithioarsenite trianion to Ag^{+} (arsenic is colored violet).

Trithioarsenite, also called sulfarsenite, is the trianion AsS^{3−}_{3}. It is a pyramidal anion, as is typical of other As^{III}X_{3} compounds. It is generated by treatment of As_{2}S_{3} with a sulfide:

As_{2}S_{3} + 3 S^{2−} → 2 AsS^{3−}_{3}

A fundamental synthetic trithioarsenite is Na_{3}AsS_{3}, which features the pyramidal AsS^{3−}_{3}.

Thioarsenites are components of many sulfosalt minerals. An example is relatively common mineral proustite, Ag_{3}AsS_{3}, which is silver(I) trithioarsenite.
