= Tin triphosphide =

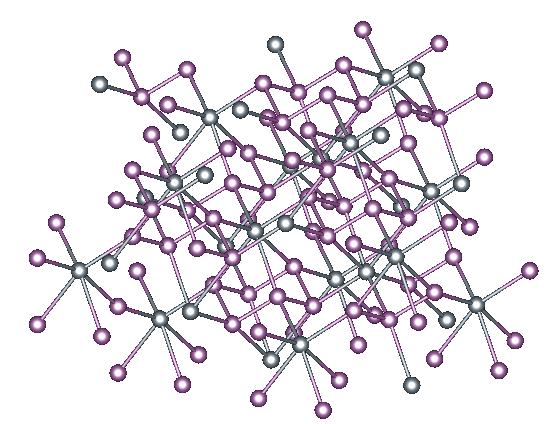

Identifiers
CAS Number	37367-13-8
3D model (JSmol)	Interactive image
- InChI: InChI=1S/P6.2Sn/c1-2-4-6-5-3-1;;/q-6;+2;+4 Key: XGCQQRBUMQDXAA-UHFFFAOYSA-N
- SMILES: [Sn+2].[Sn+4].[P-]1=[P-][P-]=[P-][P-]=[P-]1

Properties
Chemical formula	P_{3}Sn
Molar mass	211.631 g·mol^{−1}
Appearance	black solid
Density	4.25 g/cm^{3}
Melting point	580 °C (1,076 °F; 853 K)
Solubility in water	insoluble
- Except where otherwise noted, data are given for materials in their standard state (at 25 °C [77 °F], 100 kPa). Infobox references

Tin triphosphide is a binary inorganic compound of tin metal and phosphorus with the chemical formula SnP_{3}.

== Structure ==
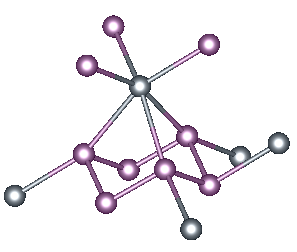
Close up on the structure of SnP_{3}, highlighting the bonding around P (violet) and Sn (gray).

X-ray crystallography reveals that tin triphosphide is not a triphosphide. It is a hexaphosphide, with P_{6}^{6-} rings. These ruffled P_{6} rings form three short (2.66 Å) and three long (2.95 Å) Sn-P bonds. The result is that Sn(II) adopts highly distorted octahedral geometry. The structure of tin triphosphide resembles that of gray arsenic, which also features corrugated, linked six-membered (As_{6}) rings, wherein each arsenic atom has a highly distorted octahedral geometry. Germanium triphosphide and tin triphosphide are similar structurally as well.

Tin triphosphide forms triclinic crystals, spatial group R3m with six formula units in a unit cell of dimensions a = 7.378 Å and c = 10.512 Å.

== Preparation and occurrence ==
Tin triphosphide can be formed from the fusion of stoichiometric amounts of both elements at 580 °C:

4 Sn + 3 P_{4} → 4 SnP_{3}

SnP_{3} has been evaluated for use in energy storage devices.

== Related compounds ==
- SnP, which has the sodium chloride structure.
- Sn_{4}P_{3}
