= Sulfido =

Sulfido refers to the ligand species S^{2−}. There is only one donor atom present in this ligand which is sulfur. It also refers to the ligand or functional group −S^{−}, which is a sulfur atom bonded to the rest of molecule by a single bond, and has a charge of −1.
