= Antimony pentasulfide =

Inorganic compound of antimony and sulfur

Names
- Other names Antimony red

Identifiers
CAS Number	1315-04-4
3D model (JSmol)	Interactive image
ChEBI	CHEBI:134733
ChemSpider	17615643
ECHA InfoCard	100.013.869
EC Number	215-255-5
PubChem CID	16683083
UNII	1433F1I86N
CompTox Dashboard (EPA)	DTXSID8046583
- InChI: InChI=1S/5S.2Sb Key: PPKVREKQVQREQD-UHFFFAOYSA-N
- SMILES: S=[Sb](=S)S[Sb](=S)=S

Properties
Chemical formula	Sb_{2}S_{5}
Molar mass	403.82 g·mol^{−1}
Appearance	Red powder
Density	4.12 g/cm ^{-3}
Melting point	135 °C (275 °F; 408 K) (decomposes)
Solubility in water	insoluble
Solubility	soluble in HCl, alkalis, ammonium hydrosulfide

Pharmacology
ATC code	R05CA07 (WHO)

Hazards
- GHS labelling
Pictograms	(GHS02: Flammable) (GHS07: Exclamation mark) (GHS09: Environmental hazard)
Signal word	Warning
Hazard statements	H228, H302, H332, H411
Precautionary statements	P210, P240, P241, P261, P264, P270, P271, P273, P280, P301+P312, P304+P312, P304+P340, P312, P330, P370+P378, P391, P501
Flash point	flammable
- NIOSH (US health exposure limits)
PEL (Permissible)	TWA 0.5 mg/m^{3} (as Sb)
REL (Recommended)	TWA 0.5 mg/m^{3} (as Sb)

Related compounds
Related compounds	Antimony(III) sulfide
- Except where otherwise noted, data are given for materials in their standard state (at 25 °C [77 °F], 100 kPa). verify (what is ?) Infobox references

Antimony pentasulfide is an inorganic compound of antimony and sulfur, also known as antimony red. It is a nonstoichiometric compound with a variable composition. Its structure is unknown. Commercial samples are contaminated with sulfur, which may be removed by washing with carbon disulfide in a Soxhlet extractor.

== Production ==
Antimony pentasulfide can be produced by the reaction of antimony with sulfur at a temperature from 250 to 400 °C in an inert atmosphere.

== Uses ==
It may be used as a red pigment and is one possible precursor to Schlippe's salt, Na_{3}SbS_{4}·9H_{2}O, which can be prepared according to the equation:

3 Na_{2}S + Sb_{2}S_{5} + 9 H_{2}O → 2 Na_{3}SbS_{4}·9H_{2}O

It is also used in the vulcanization of rubber to produce red rubber.

== Physical chemistry ==
Like many sulfides, this compound liberates hydrogen sulfide upon treatment with strong acids such as hydrochloric acid.

6 HCl + Sb_{2}S_{5} → 2 SbCl_{3} + 3 H_{2}S + 2 S

Analysis by Mössbauer spectroscopy indicates that this compound is a derivative antimony(III), explaining the production of antimony(III) chloride, rather than antimony(V) chloride, upon acidification. It is, therefore, not analogous to the phosphorus(V) compound phosphorus pentasulfide.
