= Antimony triselenide =

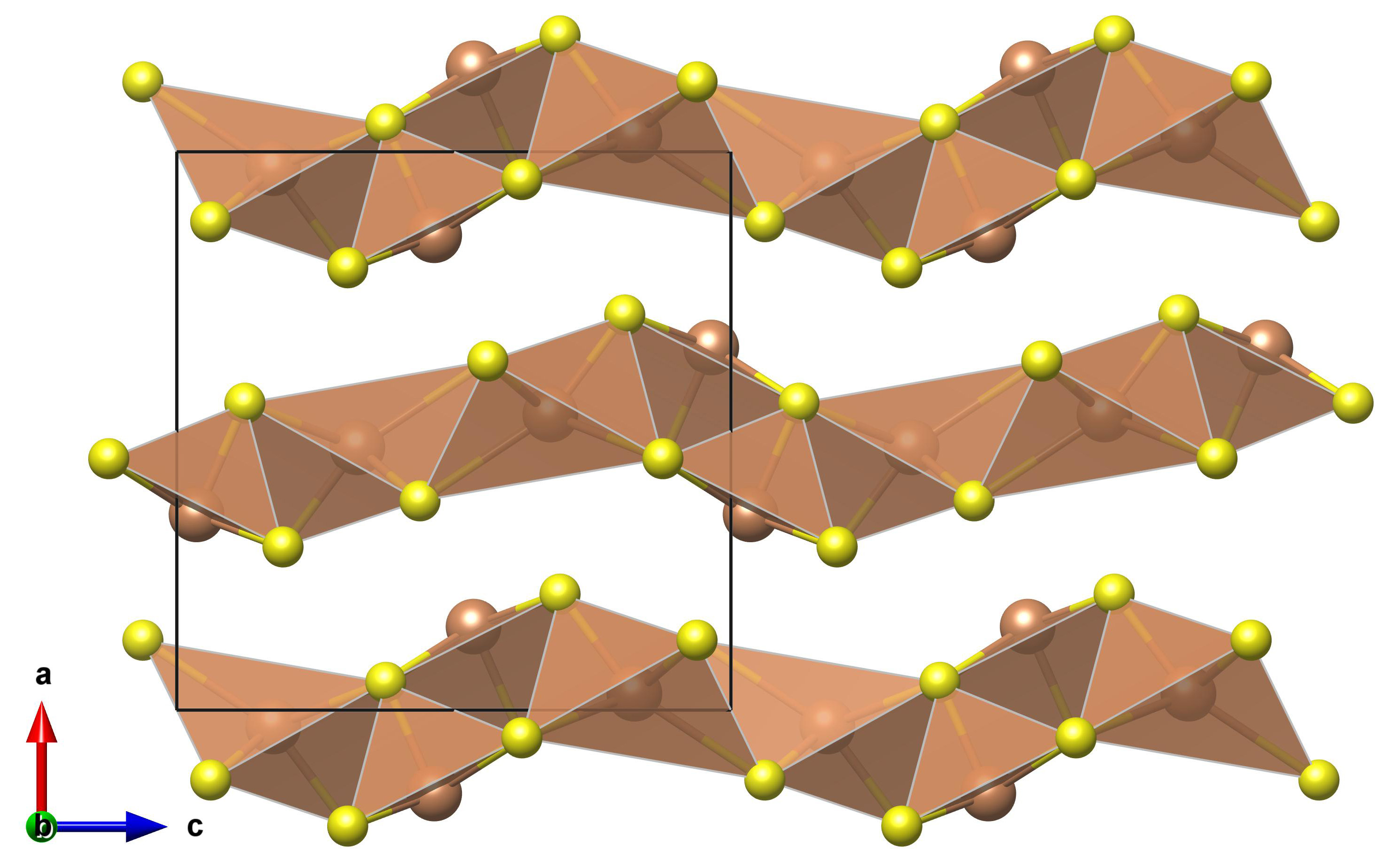

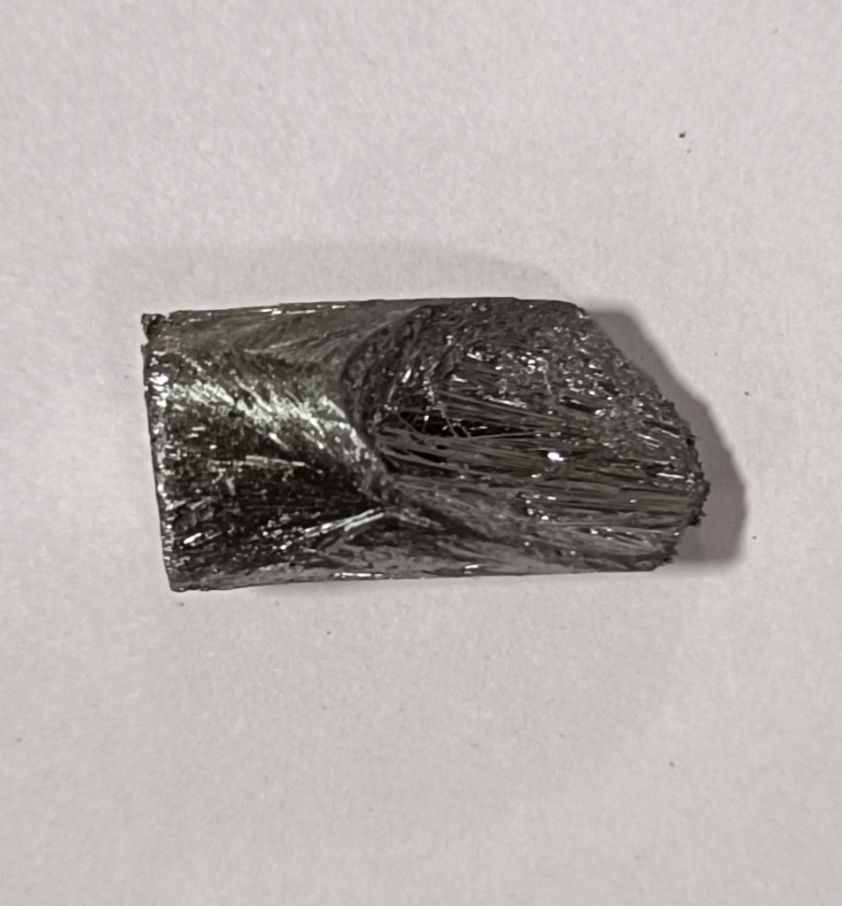

Names
- Other names: Antimonselite; Antimony(III) selenide; Selenoxyantimony

Identifiers
CAS Number	1315-05-5
3D model (JSmol)	Interactive image
ChemSpider	11483776
ECHA InfoCard	100.013.870
PubChem CID	6391662
CompTox Dashboard (EPA)	DTXSID30895002
- InChI: InChI=1S/2Sb.3Se/q2*+3;3*-2 Key: WWUNXXBCFXOXHC-UHFFFAOYSA-N; InChI=1S/2Sb.3Se/q2*+3;3*-2; Key: WWUNXXBCFXOXHC-UHFFFAOYSA-N
- SMILES: [SbH3+3].[SbH3+3].[Se-2].[Se-2].[Se-2]

Properties
Chemical formula	Sb_{2}Se_{3}
Molar mass	480.433 g·mol^{−1}
Appearance	black crystals
Density	5.81 g/cm^{3}, solid
Melting point	611 °C (1,132 °F; 884 K)

Structure
Crystal structure	Orthorhombic, oP20, SpaceGroup = Pnma, No. 62

Hazards
- NIOSH (US health exposure limits)
PEL (Permissible)	TWA 0.5 mg/m^{3} (as Sb)
REL (Recommended)	TWA 0.5 mg/m^{3} (as Sb)

Related compounds
Other anions	antimony(III) oxide, antimony(III) sulfide, antimony(III) telluride
Other cations	arsenic(III) selenide, bismuth(III) selenide
- Except where otherwise noted, data are given for materials in their standard state (at 25 °C [77 °F], 100 kPa). verify (what is ?) Infobox references

Antimony triselenide is the chemical compound with the formula Sb_{2}Se_{3}. The material exists as the sulfosalt mineral antimonselite (IMA symbol: Atm), which crystallizes in an orthorhombic space group. In this compound, antimony has a formal oxidation state +3 and selenium −2. The bonding in this compound has covalent character as evidenced by the black color and semiconducting properties of this and related materials. The low-frequency dielectric constant (ε_{0}) has been measured to be 133 along the c axis of the crystal at room temperature, which is unusually large. Its band gap is 1.18 eV at room temperature.

The compound may be formed by the reaction of antimony with selenium and has a melting point of 885 K.

== Applications ==
Sb_{2}Se_{3} is now being actively explored for application thin-film solar cells. A record light-to-electricity conversion efficiency of 9.2% has been reported.
