= Antimony trisulfide =

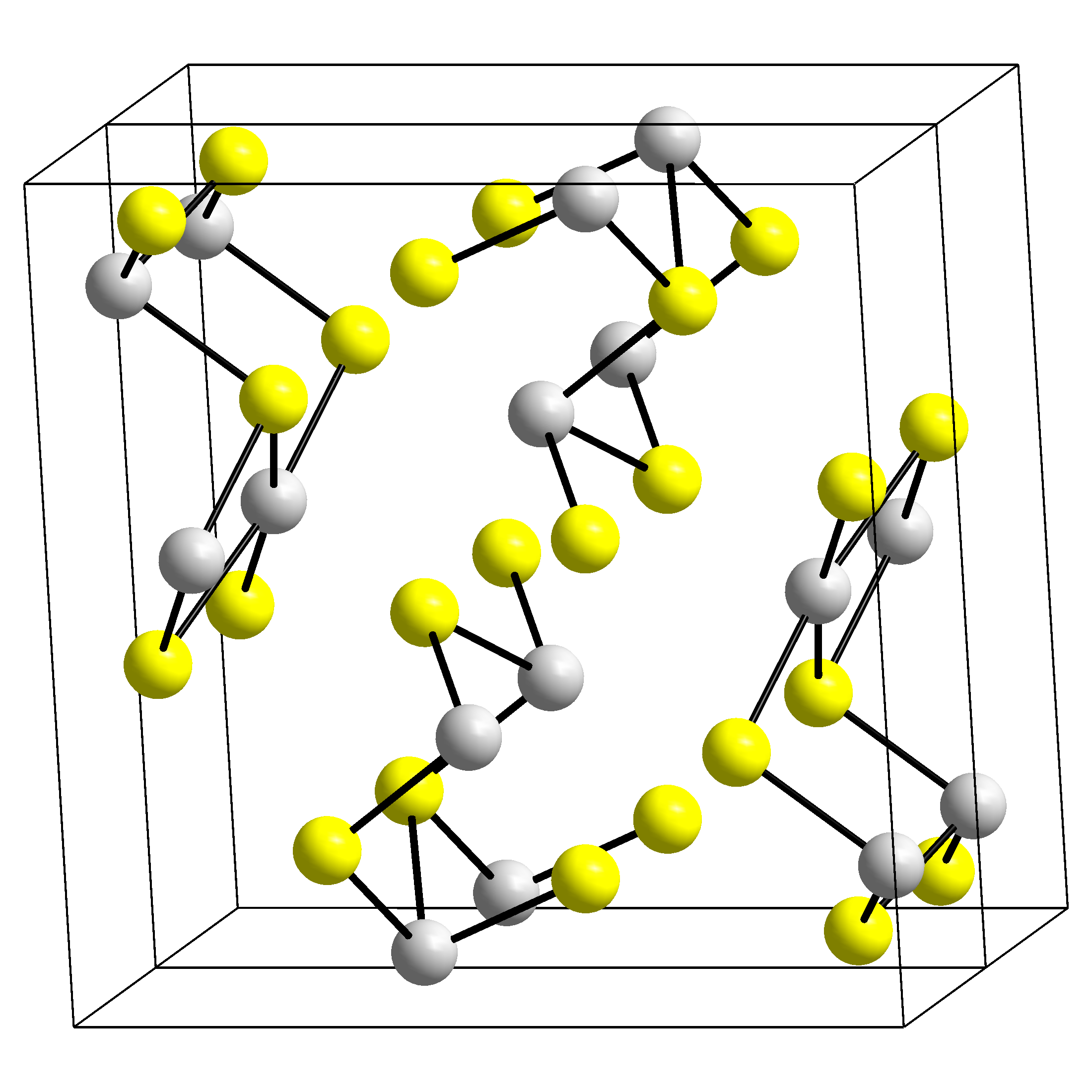

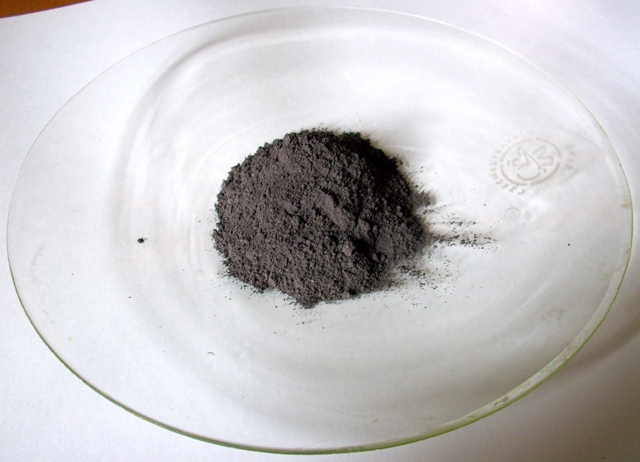

Names
- IUPAC names Antimony(III) sulfide Diantimony trisulfide
- Other names: Antimonous sulfide; Antimony sesquisulfide; Antimony sulfide; Antimony vermilion; Black antimony; Sulphuret of antimony

Identifiers
CAS Number	1345-04-6
3D model (JSmol)	Interactive image
ChemSpider	17621613
ECHA InfoCard	100.014.285
PubChem CID	16689752
UNII	F79059A38U
CompTox Dashboard (EPA)	DTXSID6030732
- InChI: InChI=1S/3O.2Sb Key: IHBMMJGTJFPEQY-UHFFFAOYSA-N
- SMILES: S=[Sb]S[Sb]=S

Properties
Chemical formula	Sb_{2}S_{3}
Molar mass	339.70 g·mol^{−1}
Appearance	Grey or black orthorhombic crystals (stibnite)
Density	4.562g cm^{−3} (stibnite)
Melting point	550 °C (1,022 °F; 823 K) (stibnite)
Boiling point	1,150 °C (2,100 °F; 1,420 K)
Solubility in water	0.00017 g/(100 mL) (18 °C)
Magnetic susceptibility (χ)	−86.0·10^{−6} cm^{3}/mol
Refractive index (n_{D})	4.046

Thermochemistry
Heat capacity (C)	123.32 J/(mol·K)
Std enthalpy of formation (Δ_{f}H^{⦵}_{298})	−157.8 kJ/mol

Hazards
NFPA 704 (fire diamond)	2 0 0
- Lethal dose or concentration (LD, LC)
LD_{50} (median dose)	> 2000 mg/kg (rat, oral)
- NIOSH (US health exposure limits)
PEL (Permissible)	TWA 0.5 mg/m^{3} (as Sb)
REL (Recommended)	TWA 0.5 mg/m^{3} (as Sb)

Related compounds
Other anions	Antimony trioxide; Antimony triselenide; Antimony telluride
Other cations	Arsenic trisulfide Bismuth(III) sulfide
Related compounds	Antimony pentasulfide
- Except where otherwise noted, data are given for materials in their standard state (at 25 °C [77 °F], 100 kPa). Infobox references

Antimony trisulfide (Sb_{2}S_{3}) is found in nature as the crystalline mineral stibnite and the amorphous red mineral (actually a mineraloid) metastibnite. It is manufactured for use in safety matches, military ammunition, explosives and fireworks. It is also used as a friction material in brake linings. It is a critical primer material for military applications and tracer bullets. It also is used in the production of ruby-colored glass and in plastics as a flame retardant. Historically the stibnite form was used as a grey pigment in paintings produced in the 16th century. In 1817, the dye and fabric chemist, John Mercer discovered the non-stoichiometric compound Antimony Orange (approximate formula Sb_{2}S_{3}·Sb_{2}O_{3}), the first good orange pigment available for cotton fabric printing.

Antimony trisulfide was also used as the image sensitive photoconductor in vidicon camera tubes. It is a semiconductor with a direct band gap of 1.8–2.5 eV. With suitable doping, p and n type materials can be produced.

== Preparation and reactions ==
Sb_{2}S_{3} can be prepared from the elements at temperature 500–900 °C:

2 Sb + 3 S → Sb_{2}S_{3}

Sb_{2}S_{3} is precipitated when H_{2}S is passed through an acidified solution of Sb(III). This reaction has been used as a gravimetric method for determining antimony, bubbling H_{2}S through a solution of Sb(III) compound in hot HCl deposits an orange form of Sb_{2}S_{3} which turns black under the reaction conditions.

Sb_{2}S_{3} is readily oxidised, reacting vigorously with oxidising agents. It burns in air with a blue flame. It reacts with incandescence with cadmium, magnesium and zinc chlorates. Mixtures of Sb_{2}S_{3} and chlorates may explode.

In the extraction of antimony from antimony ores the alkaline sulfide process is employed where Sb_{2}S_{3} reacts to form thioantimonate(III) salts (also called thioantimonite):

3 Na_{2}S + Sb_{2}S_{3} → 2 Na_{3}SbS_{3}

A number of salts containing different thioantimonate(III) ions can be prepared from Sb_{2}S_{3}. These include:

[SbS_{3}]^{3−}, [SbS_{2}]^{−}, [Sb_{2}S_{5}]^{4−}, [Sb_{4}S_{9}]^{6−}, [Sb_{4}S_{7}]^{2−} and [Sb_{8}S_{17}]^{10−}

Schlippe's salt, Na_{3}SbS_{4}·9H_{2}O, a thioantimonate(V) salt is formed when Sb_{2}S_{3} is boiled with sulfur and sodium hydroxide. The reaction can be represented as:

Sb_{2}S_{3} + 3 S^{2−} + 2 S → 2 [SbS_{4}]^{3−}

== Structure ==
The structure of the black needle-like form of Sb_{2}S_{3}, stibnite, consists of linked ribbons in which antimony atoms are in two different coordination environments, trigonal pyramidal and square pyramidal. Similar ribbons occur in Bi_{2}S_{3} and Sb_{2}Se_{3}. The red form, metastibnite, is amorphous. Recent work suggests that there are a number of closely related temperature dependent structures of stibnite which have been termed stibnite (I) the high temperature form, identified previously, stibnite (II) and stibnite (III). Other paper shows that the actual coordination polyhedra of antimony are in fact SbS_{7}, with (3+4) coordination at the M1 site and (5+2) at the M2 site. These coordinations consider the presence of secondary bonds. Some of the secondary bonds impart cohesion and are connected with packing.
