= Arsenic trisulfide =

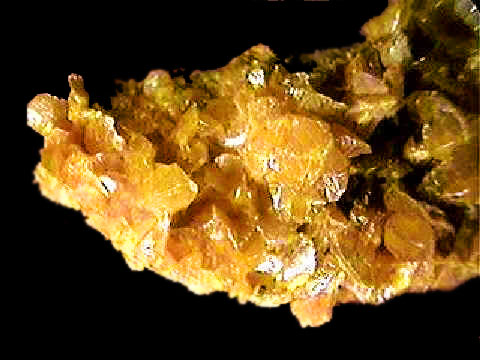
- Sample of arsenic trisulfide as orpiment mineral

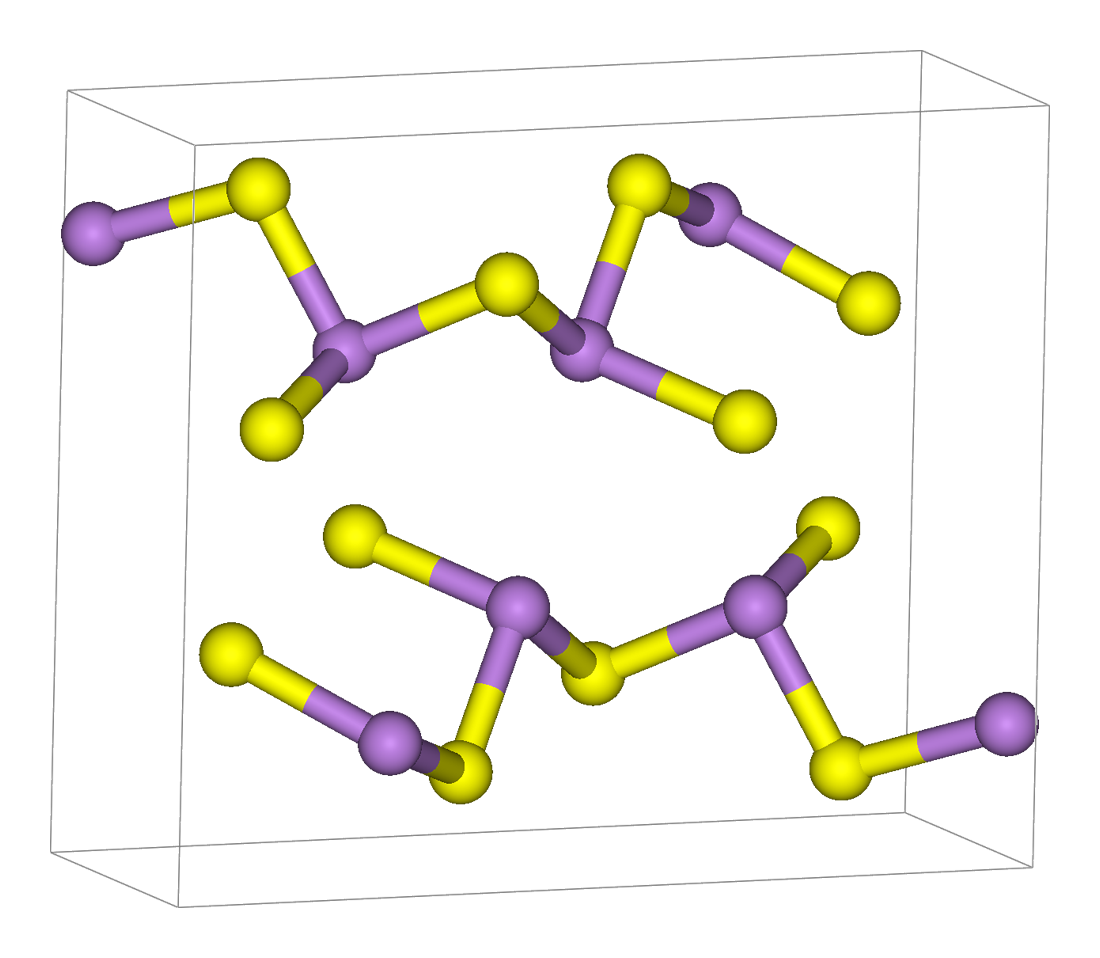
- Ball and stick unit cell model of polymeric arsenic trisulfide

- Arsenic trisulfide

Names
- Preferred IUPAC name Arsenic trisulfide
- Other names: Arsenic(III) sulfide; Orpiment; Sulphuret of arsenic

Identifiers
| CAS Number | 1303-33-9 |
| 3D model (JSmol) | Interactive image |
| ChemSpider | 21241348 |
| ECHA InfoCard | 100.013.744 |
| EC Number | 215-117-4 |
| PubChem CID | 4093503 |
| RTECS number | CG2638000 |
| UNII | 44SIJ800OX |
| CompTox Dashboard (EPA) | DTXSID50274153 |
- InChI: InChI=1S/As4S6/c5-1-6-3-8-2(5)9-4(7-1)10-3 Key: OUFDYFBZNDIAPD-UHFFFAOYSA-N; InChI=1/As4S6/c5-1-6-3-8-2(5)9-4(7-1)10-3 Key: OUFDYFBZNDIAPD-UHFFFAOYAM
- SMILES: S1[As]3S[As]2S[As](S[As]1S2)S3

Properties
| Chemical formula | As_{2}S_{3} |
| Molar mass | 246.02 g·mol^{−1} |
| Appearance | yellow or orange crystals |
| Density | 3.43 g/cm^{3} |
| Melting point | 310 °C (590 °F; 583 K) |
| Boiling point | 707 °C (1,305 °F; 980 K) |
| Solubility in water | insoluble |
| Solubility | soluble in ammonia |
| Magnetic susceptibility (χ) | −70.0·10^{−6} cm^{3}/mol |

Structure
| Crystal structure | monoclinic |
| Space group | P2_{1}/n (No. 11) |
| Lattice constant | a = 1147.5(5) pm, b = 957.7(4) pm, c = 425.6(2) pm α = 90°, β = 90.68(8)°, γ = 90° |
| Coordination geometry | pyramidal (As) |

Hazards
- GHS labelling
| Pictograms | |
| Signal word | Danger |
| Hazard statements | H300, H331, H400, H411 |
| NFPA 704 (fire diamond) | 3 0 0 |
- NIOSH (US health exposure limits)
| PEL (Permissible) | [1910.1018] TWA 0.010 mg/m^{3} |
| REL (Recommended) | Ca C 0.002 mg/m^{3} [15-minute] |
| IDLH (Immediate danger) | Ca [5 mg/m^{3} (as As)] |

Related compounds
| Related compounds | Arsenic trioxide; Arsenic triselenide; Arsenic tritelluride; Phosphorus trisulfide; Antimony trisulfide; Bismuth trisulfide; Tetraarsenic tetrasulfide |
- Except where otherwise noted, data are given for materials in their standard state (at 25 °C [77 °F], 100 kPa). verify (what is ?) Infobox references

Arsenic trisulfide is the inorganic compound with the formula As_{2}S_{3}. It is a dark yellow solid that is insoluble in water. It also occurs as the mineral orpiment (Latin: auripigmentum), which has been used as a pigment called King's yellow. It is produced in the analysis of arsenic compounds. It is a group V/VI, intrinsic p-type semiconductor and exhibits photo-induced phase-change properties.

== Structure ==
As_{2}S_{3} occurs both in crystalline and amorphous forms. Both forms feature polymeric structures consisting of trigonal pyramidal As(III) centres linked by sulfide centres. The sulfide centres are two-fold coordinated to two arsenic atoms. In the crystalline form, the compound adopts a ruffled sheet structure. The bonding between the sheets consists of van der Waals forces. The crystalline form is usually found in geological samples. Amorphous As_{2}S_{3} does not possess a layered structure but is more highly cross-linked. Like other glasses, there is no medium or long-range order, but the first co-ordination sphere is well defined. As_{2}S_{3} is a good glass former and exhibits a wide glass-forming region in its phase diagram.

== Properties ==
It is a semiconductor, with a direct band gap of 2.7 eV. The wide band gap makes it transparent to infrared light between 620 nm and 11 μm.

== Synthesis ==
=== From the elements ===
Amorphous As_{2}S_{3} is obtained via the fusion of the elements at 390 °C. Rapid cooling of the reaction melt gives a glass. The reaction can be represented with the chemical equation:

2 As + 3 S → As_{2}S_{3}

=== Aqueous precipitation ===
As_{2}S_{3} forms when aqueous solutions containing As(III) are treated with H_{2}S. Arsenic was in the past analyzed and assayed by this reaction, which results in the precipitation of As_{2}S_{3}, which is then weighed. As_{2}S_{3} can even be precipitated in 6 M HCl. As_{2}S_{3} is so insoluble that it is not toxic.

== Reactions ==
Upon heating in a vacuum, polymeric As_{2}S_{3} "cracks" to give a mixture of molecular species, including molecular As_{4}S_{6}. As_{4}S_{6} adopts the adamantane geometry, like that observed for P_{4}O_{6} and As_{4}O_{6}. When a film of this material is exposed to an external energy source such as thermal energy (via thermal annealing), electromagnetic radiation (i.e. UV lamps, lasers, electron beams)), As_{4}S_{6} polymerizes:

2 (As_{2}S_{3})_{n} ⇌ n As_{4}S_{6}

As_{2}S_{3} characteristically dissolves upon treatment with aqueous solutions containing sulfide ions. The dissolved arsenic species is the pyramidal trithioarsenite anion AsS^{3−}_{3}:

As_{2}S_{3} + 6 NaSH → 2 AsS^{3−}_{3} + 3 H_{2}S

As_{2}S_{3} is the anhydride of the hypothetical trithioarsenous acid, As(SH)_{3}. Upon treatment with polysulfide ions, As_{2}S_{3} dissolves to give a variety of species containing both S–S and As–S bonds. One derivative is S_{7}As−S^{−}, an eight-membered ring that contains 7 S atoms and 1 As atom, and an exocyclic sulfido center attached to the As atom. As_{2}S_{3} also dissolves in strongly alkaline solutions to give a mixture of AsS^{3−}_{3} and AsO^{3−}_{3}.

"Roasting" As_{2}S_{3} in air gives volatile, toxic derivatives, this conversion being one of the hazards associated with the refining of heavy metal ores:

2 As_{2}S_{3} + 9 O_{2} → As_{4}O_{6} + 6 SO_{2}

== Contemporary uses ==
=== As an inorganic photoresist ===
Due to its high refractive index of 2.45 and its large Knoop hardness compared to organic photoresists, As_{2}S_{3} has been investigated for the fabrication of photonic crystals with a full-photonic band-gap. Advances in laser patterning techniques such as three-dimensional direct laser writing (3-D DLW) and chemical wet-etching chemistry, has allowed this material to be used as a photoresist to fabricate 3-D nanostructures.

As_{2}S_{3} has been investigated for use as a high resolution photoresist material since the early 1970s, using aqueous etchants. Although these aqueous etchants allowed for low-aspect ratio 2-D structures to be fabricated, they do not allow for the etching of high aspect ratio structures with 3-D periodicity. Certain organic reagents, used in organic solvents, permit the high-etch selectivity required to produce high-aspect ratio structures with 3-D periodicity.

=== Medical applications ===
As_{2}S_{3} and As_{4}S_{4} have been investigated as treatments for acute promyelocytic leukemia (APL).

=== For IR-transmitting glasses ===
Arsenic trisulfide manufactured into amorphous form is used as a chalcogenide glass for infrared optics. It is transparent for light between wavelengths of 620 nm and 11 μm. The arsenic trisulfide glass is more resistant to oxidation than crystalline arsenic trisulfide, which minimizes toxicity concerns. It can be also used as an acousto-optic material.

Arsenic trisulfide was used for the distinctive eight-sided conical nose over the infra-red seeker of the de Havilland Firestreak missile.

=== Role in ancient artistry ===
The ancient Egyptians reportedly used orpiment, natural or synthetic, as a pigment in artistry and cosmetics.

=== Miscellaneous ===
Arsenic trisulfide is also used as a tanning agent. It was formerly used with indigo dye for the production of pencil blue, which allowed dark blue hues to be added to fabric via pencil or brush.

Precipitation of arsenic trisulfide is used as an analytical test for presence of dissimilatory arsenic-reducing bacteria (DARB).

== Safety ==
As_{2}S_{3} is so insoluble that its toxicity is low. Aged samples can contain substantial amounts of arsenic oxides, which are soluble and therefore highly toxic.

== Natural occurrence ==
Orpiment is found in volcanic environments, often together with other arsenic sulfides, mainly realgar. It is produced in the alvinellid worm Paralvinella hessleri, found in deep-sea hydrothermal vents in the western Pacific. The resulting orpiment reaches about 10 mg/g of whole-body fresh weight—roughly one order of magnitude higher than any other known biological tissue arsenic accumulation.
