= Arsenic triselenide =

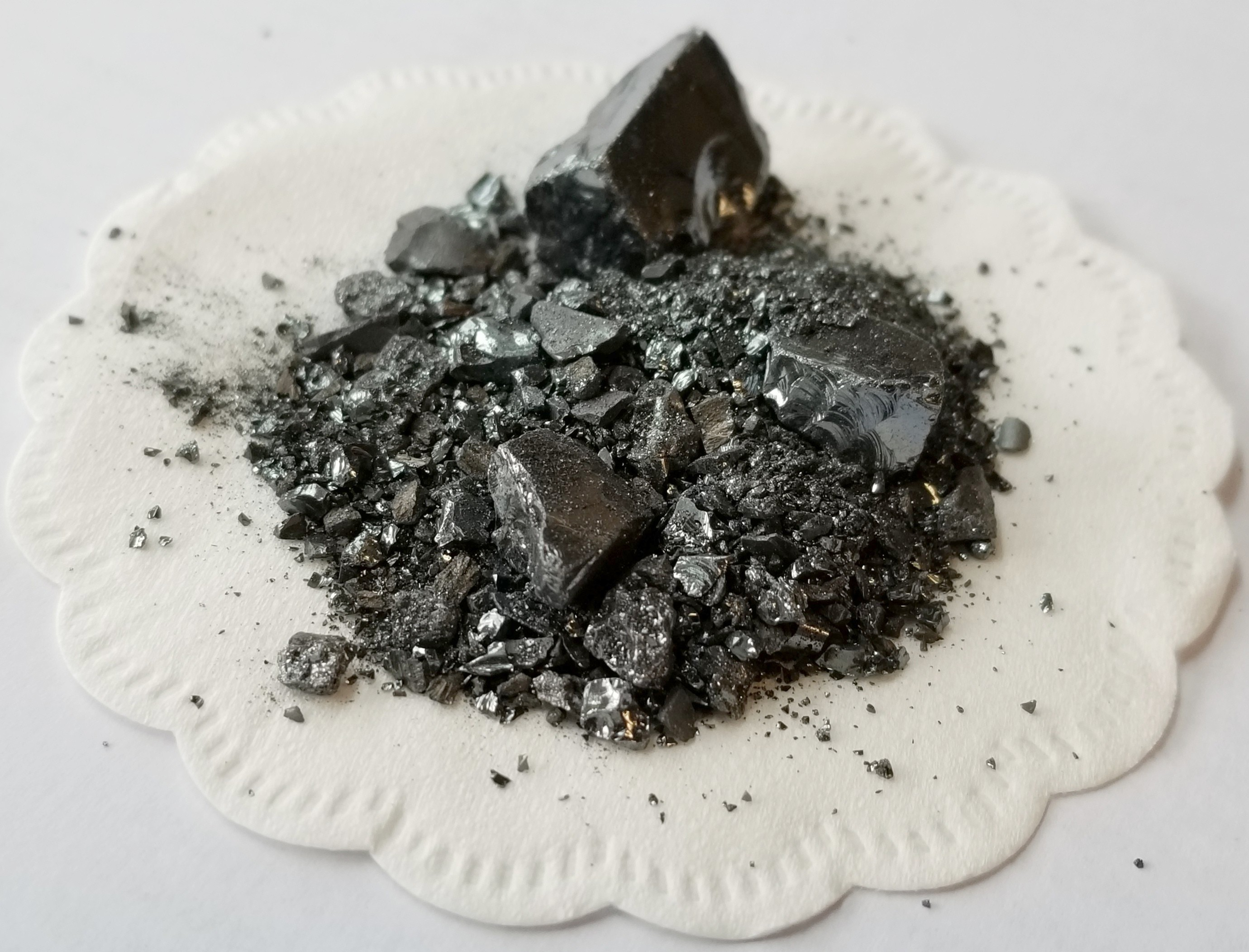

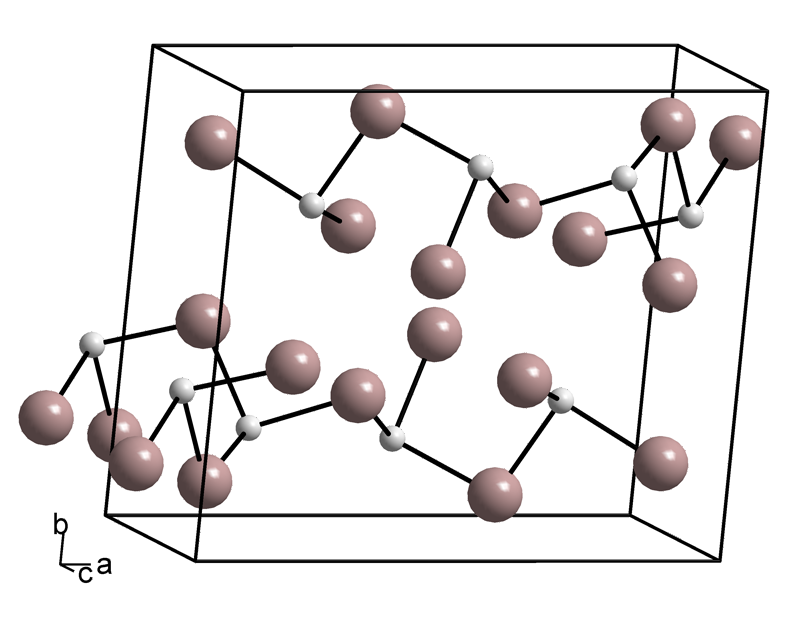

Names
- Other names Arsenic(III) selenide

Identifiers
CAS Number	1303-36-2
3D model (JSmol)	Interactive image
ChemSpider	14089
ECHA InfoCard	100.013.745
EC Number	215-119-5
PubChem CID	14772
RTECS number	CG2285000
UNII	XWS0W0GB8G
CompTox Dashboard (EPA)	DTXSID7061645
- InChI: InChI=1S/As2Se3/c3-1-5-2-4 Key: WBFMCDAQUDITAS-UHFFFAOYSA-N; InChI=1/As2Se3/c3-1-5-2-4 Key: WBFMCDAQUDITAS-UHFFFAOYAQ
- SMILES: [Se]=[As][Se][As]=[Se]

Properties
Chemical formula	As_{2}Se_{3}
Molar mass	386.756 g·mol^{−1}
Appearance	brown-black powder or metallic gray crystals
Odor	odorless
Density	4.75 g/cm^{3}
Melting point	377 °C (711 °F; 650 K)
Solubility in water	insoluble

Structure
Crystal structure	Monoclinic, mP20
Space group	P2_{1}/c, No. 14
Lattice constant	a = 0.43 nm, b = 0.994 nm, c = 1.29058 nm α = 90°, β = 109.927°, γ = 90°
Formula units (Z)	4

Hazards
- GHS labelling
Pictograms	(GHS06: Toxic) (GHS08: Health hazard) (GHS09: Environmental hazard)
Signal word	Danger
Hazard statements	H301, H330, H331, H373, H410
Precautionary statements	P260, P264, P270, P271, P273, P284, P301+P310, P304+P340, P310, P311, P314, P320, P321, P330, P391, P403+P233, P405, P501
NFPA 704 (fire diamond)	4 0 0

Related compounds
Other anions	diarsenic trioxide; diarsenic trisulfide; arsenic(III) telluride
Other cations	antimony(III) selenide
Related compounds	arsenic(V) selenide
- Except where otherwise noted, data are given for materials in their standard state (at 25 °C [77 °F], 100 kPa). verify (what is ?) Infobox references

Arsenic triselenide is an inorganic chemical compound with the chemical formula As_{2}Se_{3}.

Amorphous arsenic triselenide is used as a chalcogenide glass for infrared optics. When purified, it transmits light with wavelengths between ca. 0.7 and 19 μm.

In arsenic triselenide, arsenic is covalently bonded to selenium, where arsenic has a formal oxidation state of +3, and selenium −2.

== Solution processed thin film As_{2}Se_{3} ==
Thin film selenide glasses have emerged as an important material for integrated photonics due to its high refractive index, mid-IR transparency and high non-linear optical indices. High-quality As_{2}Se_{3} glass films can be deposited from spin coating method from ethylenediamine solutions.
