= Bismuth telluride =

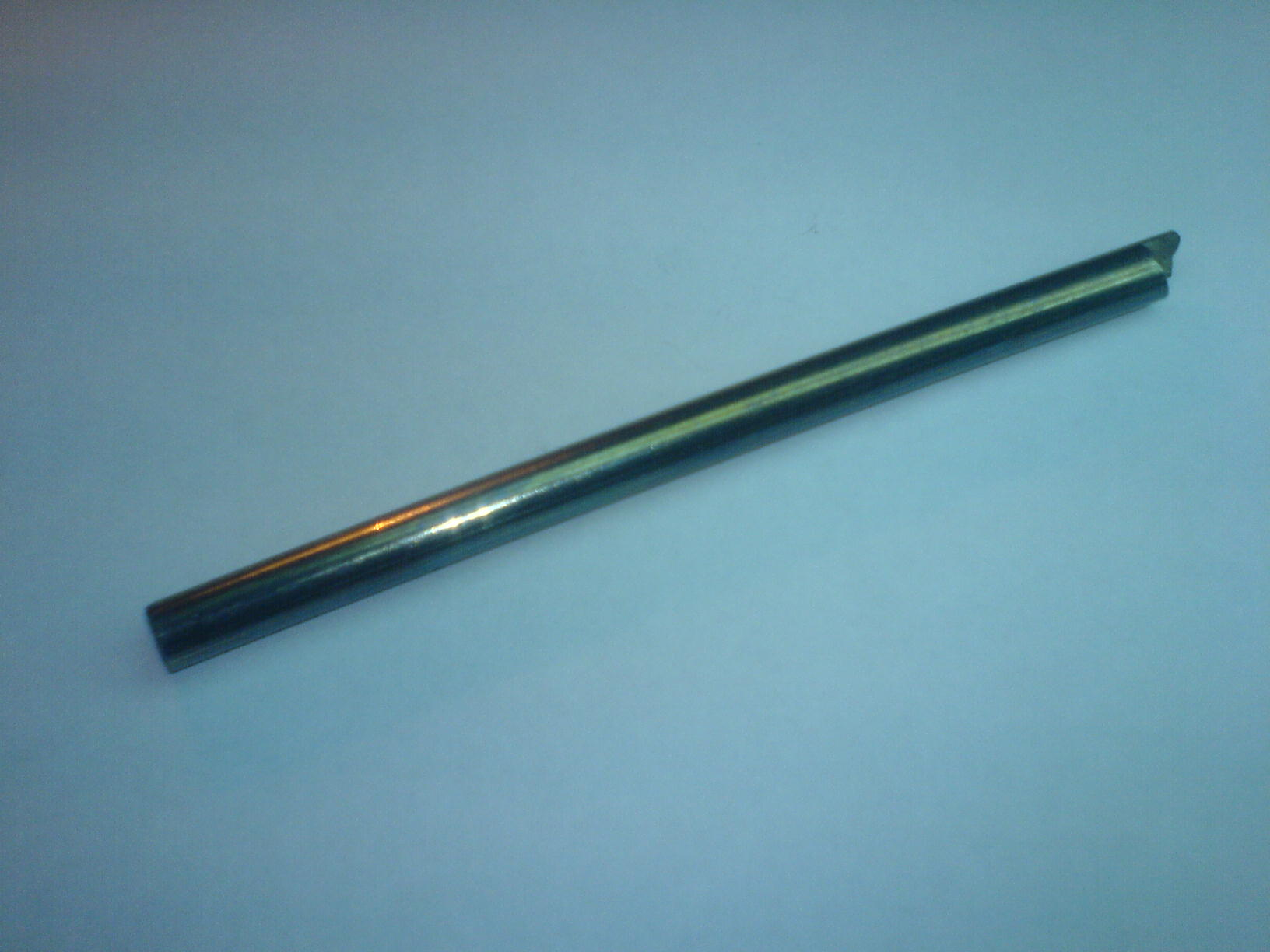
- Single crystal of bismuth telluride

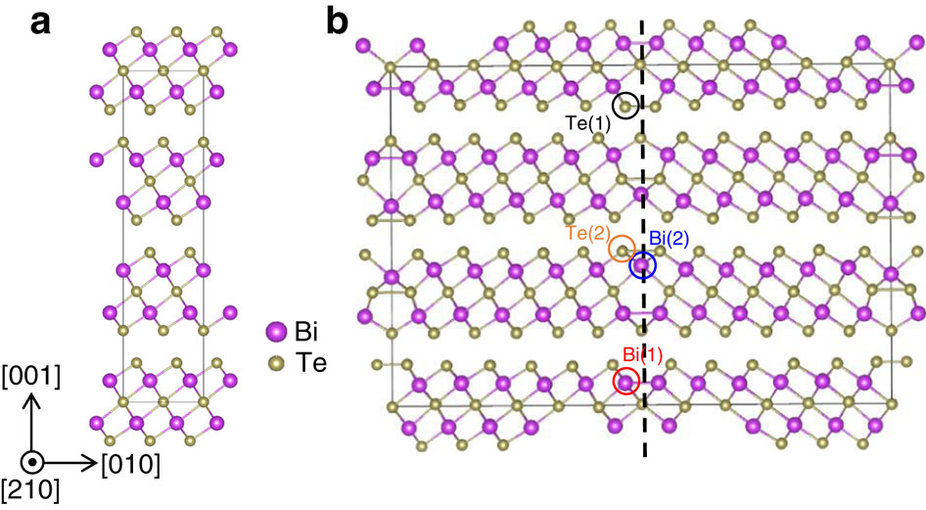
- Atomic structure: ideal (l) and with a twin defect (r)

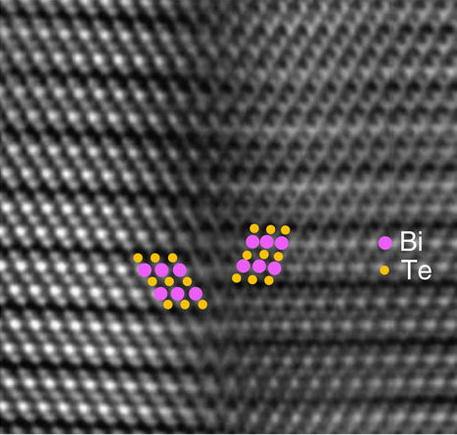
- Electron micrograph of twinned bismuth telluride

Identifiers
CAS Number	1304-82-1
3D model (JSmol)	Interactive image
ChemSpider	11278988
ECHA InfoCard	100.013.760
EC Number	215-135-2
PubChem CID	6379155
UNII	1818R19OHO
CompTox Dashboard (EPA)	DTXSID90894839
- InChI: InChI=1S/2Bi.3Te/q2*+3;3*-2 Key: AZFMNKUWQAGOBM-UHFFFAOYSA-N; InChI=1/2Bi.3Te/q2*+3;3*-2 Key: AZFMNKUWQAGOBM-UHFFFAOYAF
- SMILES: [Te-2].[Te-2].[Te-2].[Bi+3].[Bi+3]

Properties
Chemical formula	Bi_{2}Te_{3}
Molar mass	800.76 g·mol^{−1}
Appearance	Grey powder or metallic grey crystals
Density	7.74 g/cm^{3}
Melting point	580 °C (1,076 °F; 853 K)
Solubility in water	insoluble
Solubility in ethanol	soluble

Structure
Crystal structure	Trigonal, hR15
Space group	R3̅m, No. 166
Lattice constant	a = 0.4395 nm, c = 3.044 nm
Formula units (Z)	3

Hazards
NFPA 704 (fire diamond)	2 0 0
Flash point	noncombustible
- NIOSH (US health exposure limits)
PEL (Permissible)	TWA 15 mg/m^{3} (total) TWA 5 mg/m^{3} (resp) (pure) none (doped with selenium sulfide)
REL (Recommended)	TWA 10 mg/m^{3} (total) TWA 5 mg/m^{3} (resp) (pure) TWA 5 mg/m^{3} (doped with selenium sulfide)
IDLH (Immediate danger)	N.D. (pure and doped)
Safety data sheet (SDS)	Sigma-Aldrich

Related compounds
Other anions	Bismuth(III) oxide; Bismuth trisulfide; Bismuth selenide
Other cations	Arsenic telluride Antimony telluride
- Except where otherwise noted, data are given for materials in their standard state (at 25 °C [77 °F], 100 kPa). verify (what is ?) Infobox references

Bismuth telluride (Bi_{2}Te_{3}) is a gray powder that is a compound of bismuth and tellurium also known as bismuth(III) telluride. It is a semiconductor, which, when alloyed with antimony or selenium, is an efficient thermoelectric material for refrigeration or portable power generation. Bi_{2}Te_{3} is a topological insulator, and thus exhibits thickness-dependent physical properties.

== Properties as a thermoelectric material ==
Bismuth telluride is a narrow-gap layered semiconductor with a trigonal unit cell. The valence and conduction band structure can be described as a many-ellipsoidal model with 6 constant-energy ellipsoids that are centered on the reflection planes. Bi_{2}Te_{3} cleaves easily along the trigonal axis due to Van der Waals bonding between neighboring tellurium atoms. Due to this, bismuth-telluride-based materials used for power generation or cooling applications must be polycrystalline. Furthermore, the Seebeck coefficient of bulk Bi_{2}Te_{3} becomes compensated around room temperature, forcing the materials used in power-generation devices to be an alloy of bismuth, antimony, tellurium, and selenium.

Recently, researchers have attempted to improve the efficiency of Bi_{2}Te_{3}-based materials by creating structures where one or more dimensions are reduced, such as nanowires or thin films. In one such instance n-type bismuth telluride was shown to have an improved Seebeck coefficient (voltage per unit temperature difference) of −287 μV/K at 54 °C, However, one must realize that Seebeck coefficient and electrical conductivity have a tradeoff: a higher Seebeck coefficient results in decreased carrier concentration and decreased electrical conductivity.

In another case, researchers report that bismuth telluride has high electrical conductivity of 1.1×10^{5} S·m/m^{2} with its very low lattice thermal conductivity of 1.20 W/(m·K), similar to ordinary glass.

== Properties as a topological insulator ==
Bismuth telluride is a well-studied topological insulator. Its physical properties have been shown to change at highly reduced thicknesses, when its conducting surface states are exposed and isolated. These thin samples are obtained through either epitaxy or mechanical exfoliation.

Epitaxial growth methods such as molecular beam epitaxy and metal organic chemical vapor deposition are common methods of obtaining thin Bi_{2}Te_{3} samples. The stoichiometry of samples obtained through such techniques can vary greatly between experiments, so Raman spectroscopy is often used to determine relative purity. However, thin Bi_{2}Te_{3} samples are resistant to Raman spectroscopy due to their low melting point and poor heat dispersion.

The crystalline structure of Bi_{2}Te_{3} allows for mechanical exfoliation of thin samples by cleaving along the trigonal axis. This process is significantly lower in yield than epitaxial growth, but produces samples without defects or impurities. Similar to extracting graphene from bulk graphite samples, this is done by applying and removing adhesive tape from successively thinner samples. This procedure has been used to obtain Bi_{2}Te_{3} flakes with a thickness of 1 nm. However, this process can leave significant amounts of adhesive residue on a standard Si/SiO_{2} substrate, which in turn obscure atomic force microscopy measurements and inhibit the placement of contacts on the substrate for purposes of testing. Common cleaning techniques such as oxygen plasma, boiling acetone and isopropyl alcohol are ineffective in removing residue.

== Occurrence and preparation ==
The mineral form of Bi_{2}Te_{3} is tellurobismuthite which is moderately rare. There are many natural bismuth tellurides of different stoichiometry, as well as compounds of the Bi-Te-S-(Se) system, like Bi_{2}Te_{2}S (tetradymite). These bismuth tellurides are part of the tetradymite group of minerals.

Bismuth telluride may be prepared simply by sealing mixed powders of bismuth and tellurium metal in a quartz tube under vacuum (critical, as an unsealed or leaking sample may explode in a furnace) and heating it to 800 °C in a muffle furnace.

== See also ==
- Thermoelectric materials
- Thermoelectric effect
- Topological insulator
