= Batteryless radio =

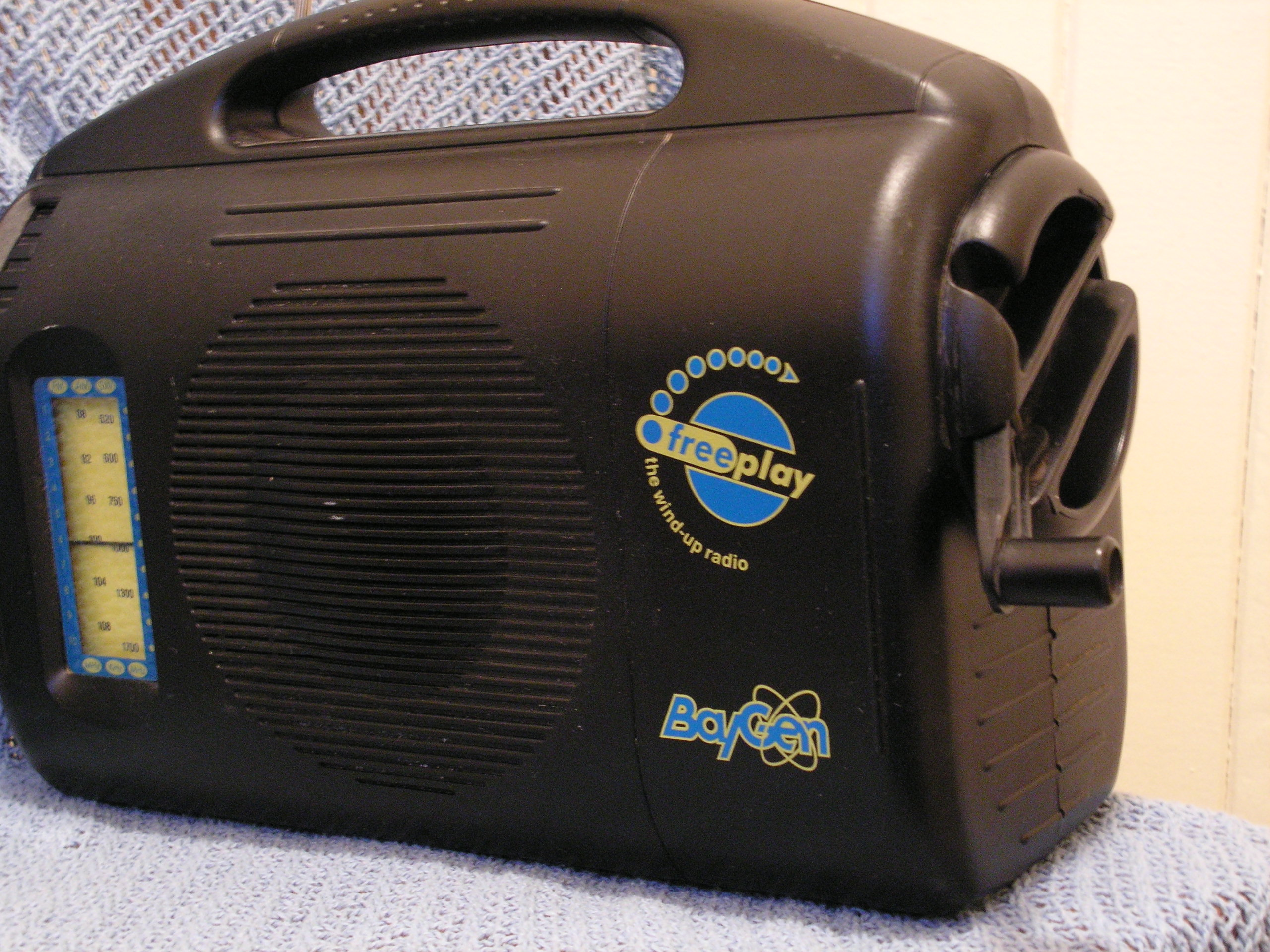
A modern clockwork radio with crank in winding position

A batteryless radio is a type of radio receiver that does not require the use of a battery to provide it with electrical power.

Originally this referred to units which could be used directly by AC mains supply (mains radio); it can also refer to units which do not require a power source at all, except for the power that they receive from an ambient radio source, such as radio waves.

== History ==
The earliest amplifying radios, vacuum tube radios, used batteries until the mid to late 1920s. The line-operated vacuum tube receiver was invented in 1925 by Edward S. Rogers, Sr. The unit operated with five Rogers AC vacuum tubes and the Rogers Battery-Eliminator Power Unit (power supply). This unit was later marketed for $120 as "Type 120". He established the Toronto station CFRB (an abbreviation of Canada's First Rogers Batteryless) to promote sales of the product. Batteryless radios were not introduced into the United States until May 1926 and then into Europe in 1927, and the industry did not widely produce batteryless radios until RCA's AC tube in late 1927.

Crystal radio receivers are a very simple kind of batteryless radio receiver. They do not need a battery or power source, except for the power that they receive from radio waves using their long outdoor wire antenna. Sharp Electronics' first electrical product was a batteryless crystal radio introduced in 1925. It was Japan's first—and sold extremely well.

Thermoelectricity was widely used in the remote parts of the Soviet Union from the 1920s to power radios. The equipment comprised some bi-metal rods (thermocouples), one end of which could be inserted into the fireplace to get hot with the other end left out in the cold.

After the Second World War, kerosene radios were made in Moscow for use in rural areas. These all-wave radios were powered by the kerosene lamp hanging above them. A group of thermocouples was heated internally to 300 °C (572 °F) by the flame. Fins cooled the outside to about 30 °C (86 °F). The temperature differential generated enough current to operate the low-drain receiver.

Foot-operated radio or pedal radio was once used in Australia. Other ways of achieving the same function are clockwork radio, hand crank radio and solar radio, especially for the Royal Flying Doctor Service and School of the Air.

As part of an energy harvesting electronics system, some batteryless radios render electricity to storage by means of storage capacitors. In this batteryless type of radio, the storage capacitors cache the electricity as static on layers of dielectric instead of chemical changes, providing energy like batteries do but 'batteryless'. This can be quite effective. Storage capacitors recharge millions of times, they are relatively cheap, somewhat insensitive to temperature, and they never need replacing—which is why they are usually soldered on. As part of an energy autarkic or energy harvesting batteryless radio, therefore, storage capacitors are an integral part, storing electricity like battery does for lean energy periods, but in a 'batteryless' way which is more sustainable. About 15 billion batteries are consumed every year worldwide.

== Carrier-powered radio ==
A carrier-powered radio is a batteryless radio which is powered by the energy in the radio waves collected by its antenna. A simple circuit (very similar to a crystal set) rectifies the incoming signal and this DC current is then used to power a small transistor amplifier. Since only a nearby radio station can provide enough power to operate the amplifier, typically the circuit tunes in a strong local station to provide power for a separate receiver to listen to weaker and more distant stations.

== See also ==
- Ambient backscatter
- Antique radio
- Battery eliminator
- Crystal radio
- Human-powered equipment
- Invention of radio
- Mechanically powered flashlight
- Pyroelectric effect
- Radio receiver
- RFID
- Solar powered radio
- Thermogenerator
- Windup radio
- Wireless light switch
