= Self-powered dynamic systems =

A self-powered dynamic system is defined as a dynamic system powered by its own excessive kinetic energy, renewable energy or a combination of both. The particular area of work is the concept of fully or partially self-powered dynamic systems requiring zero or reduced external energy inputs. The exploited technologies are particularly associated with self-powered sensors, regenerative actuators, human powered devices, and dynamic systems powered by renewable resources (e.g. solar-powered airships) as self-sustained systems. Various strategies can be employed to improve the design of a self-powered system and among them adopting a bio-inspired design is investigated to demonstrate the advantage of biomimetics in improving power density.

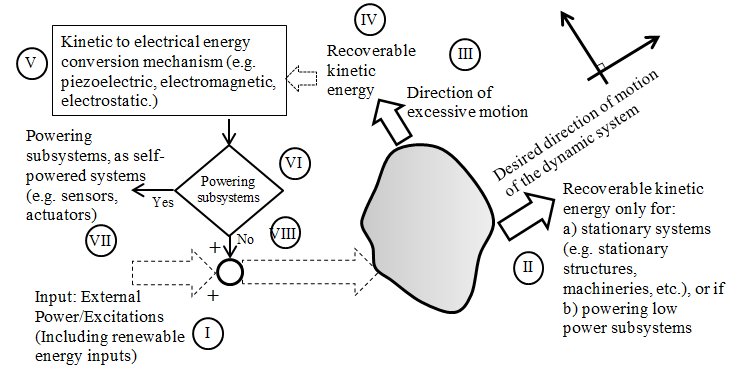
The concept of self-powered dynamic systems

The concept of "self-powered dynamic systems" in the figure is described as follows.

I. Input power (e.g. fuel energy powering a vehicle engine or propulsion system), or input excitation (e.g. vibration excitation to a structure) to the system. The source of this input energy can be of renewable energy source (e.g. solar power to a dynamic system).

II. The kinetic energy in the direction of motion of a dynamic system is only recovered if the system is stationary (e.g. a bridge structure), or the recoverable energy is negligible in comparison with the power required for motion (e.g. a low powered sensor).

III. The movement of the dynamic system perpendicular to the desired direction of the motion is usually the wasted kinetic energy in the system (e.g. the vertical motion of an automobile suspension is wasted to heat energy in the shock absorbers, or vibration of an aircraft wing is converted into heat energy through structural damping).

IV. The vertical movement of the dynamic system is a source of recoverable kinetic energy.

V. The recoverable kinetic energy can be converted to electrical energy through an energy conversion mechanism such as an electromagnetic scheme (e.g. replacing the viscous damper of a car shock absorber with regenerative actuator), piezoelectric (e.g. embedding piezoelectric material in aircraft wings), or electrostatic (e.g. vibration of a micro cantilever in a MEMS sensor).

VI. The recovered electrical power can be stored or used as a power source.

VII. The recovered electrical energy can power subsystems of the dynamic system such as sensors and actuators.

VIII. The recovered electrical power can be realized as an input to the dynamic system itself.

Such self-powered schemes are particularly beneficial in development of self-powered sensors and self-powered actuators by employing energy harvesting techniques, where kinetic energy is converted to electrical energy through piezoelectric, electromagnetic or electrostatic electromechanical mechanisms. Developing a self-powered sensor eliminates the use of an external source of power such as a battery and therefore can be considered as a self-sustained system. A self-sustained system does not required maintenance (e.g. replacing the battery of the sensor at the end of the battery life). This is particularly beneficial in remote sensing and applications in hostile or inaccessible environments.
