= Freeplay Energy =

Freeplay Energy Ltd
- Type: Public Limited Company
- Industry: Clean-energy consumer electronics
- Founded: 1994
- Headquarters: London, UK
- Key people: John McGrath, Managing Director
- Products: Radios, flashlights, lanterns, mobile phone chargers.
- Revenue: ~ USD $26M (2006)
- Website: Freeplay Energy

Freeplay Energy Ltd (AIM: FRE), (formerly BayGen Power Industries, Freeplay Energy Group), is a manufacturer and distributor of portable electrical or electronic products such as radios and lights, generally powered by hand cranked generators that charge rechargeable batteries. The company is based in London, UK. The company focuses on creating and developing the international market for self-sufficient energy products, and states that such a focus will help promote education and access to important information throughout the developing world. The company has expanded its market to include outdoor leisure and emergency preparedness markets, seeing the clear demand for self-powered products in such off-grid environments.

== History ==
=== Clockwork Radio ===
While watching the BBC documentary Tomorrow's World in April 1994, corporate accountant Christopher Staines realized the potential of an innovative idea from British inventor Trevor Baylis. The Clockwork Radio, as the device was first known, was proposed as a means of providing better communication and education in undeveloped areas of Africa, which could lead to an effective measure in stopping the rampant spread of AIDS. Traditional radio, although widespread, relied on an electrical supply or the availability of disposable batteries - both of which were in short supply across the continent.

Staines and his business partner, South African Rory Stear, immediately realized that the potential for self-sufficient electronics could go much further than radio and Africa. In 1995, they started Baygen Power Industries in Cape Town, which would be renamed in 1999. Starting with a grant from the British Government to develop the Clockwork Radio idea, subsequent investors have included Liberty Life, Gordon and Anita Roddick (of The Body Shop International PLC), The General Electric Pension Trust, South African Capital Growth Fund, and Worldspace Inc.

==== Wind-up ====
In 2013, inventor Trevor Baylis admitted he was facing having to sell his home because despite his invention, the wind-up radio, being sold around the world, he was almost bankrupt. He said his problems stemmed from Freeplay Energy, which he had joined in partnership to manufacture his radios. However, they had then altered Baylis' original design which used spring power to one that used a crank that charged an internal battery. This change meant the product was no longer subject to his patents. Baylis began a lobbying campaign to overhaul the patent systems in the UK to protect inventors from intellectual property theft. He said "other countries such as the US and Germany provide far greater protection and support to their engineers and inventors".

=== Clockwork Torch ===
While still called Baygen, the company introduced a clockwork torch. Weighing about 1 kg (2 lb), the clockwork torch incorporates two improvements over the clockwork radio. First, the on/off switch mechanically halts the spring mechanism from operating. Secondly, internal energy storage in a small rechargeable battery keeps the torch shining while the spring is rewound. One version of the clockwork torch is enclosed in clear plastic so that the inner workings can be seen.

=== Further products ===
In present Freeplay radios and other products, clockwork mechanisms storing energy in a mainspring have now been replaced by small batteries charged by cheaper hand-crank generators.

Freeplay Energy produces a variety of consumer devices in addition to radios, including flashlights, lanterns, mobile phone chargers, and foot-powered generators. They have partnered with several major brands, including camping equipment giant Coleman.

== Awards and recognition ==
Freeplay devices have captured acclaim on multiple occasions. The initial clockwork radio won the "BBC Design Award" in 1996, and the Design Council's Millennium Product Award.

The "Weza" foot-powered generator won an "Innovation in Water, Sanitation and Energy Services for Poor People" award from the World Bank in 2006. In 2007, the "Indigo" lantern was named a "Consumer Electronics Show Innovations Awards Honoree".

== See also ==
- Lifeline energy - another company making wind-up radios
- Human-powered equipment
- Mechanically-powered flashlight
