= Solar radio =

Solar radio may refer to:

- Solar-powered radio, a portable radio receiver powered by solar energy
- Solar radio emission, radio waves that are naturally produced by the Sun
- Solar Radio, a soul radio station based in London, England
