= Mechanically powered flashlight =

Human-powered flashlight

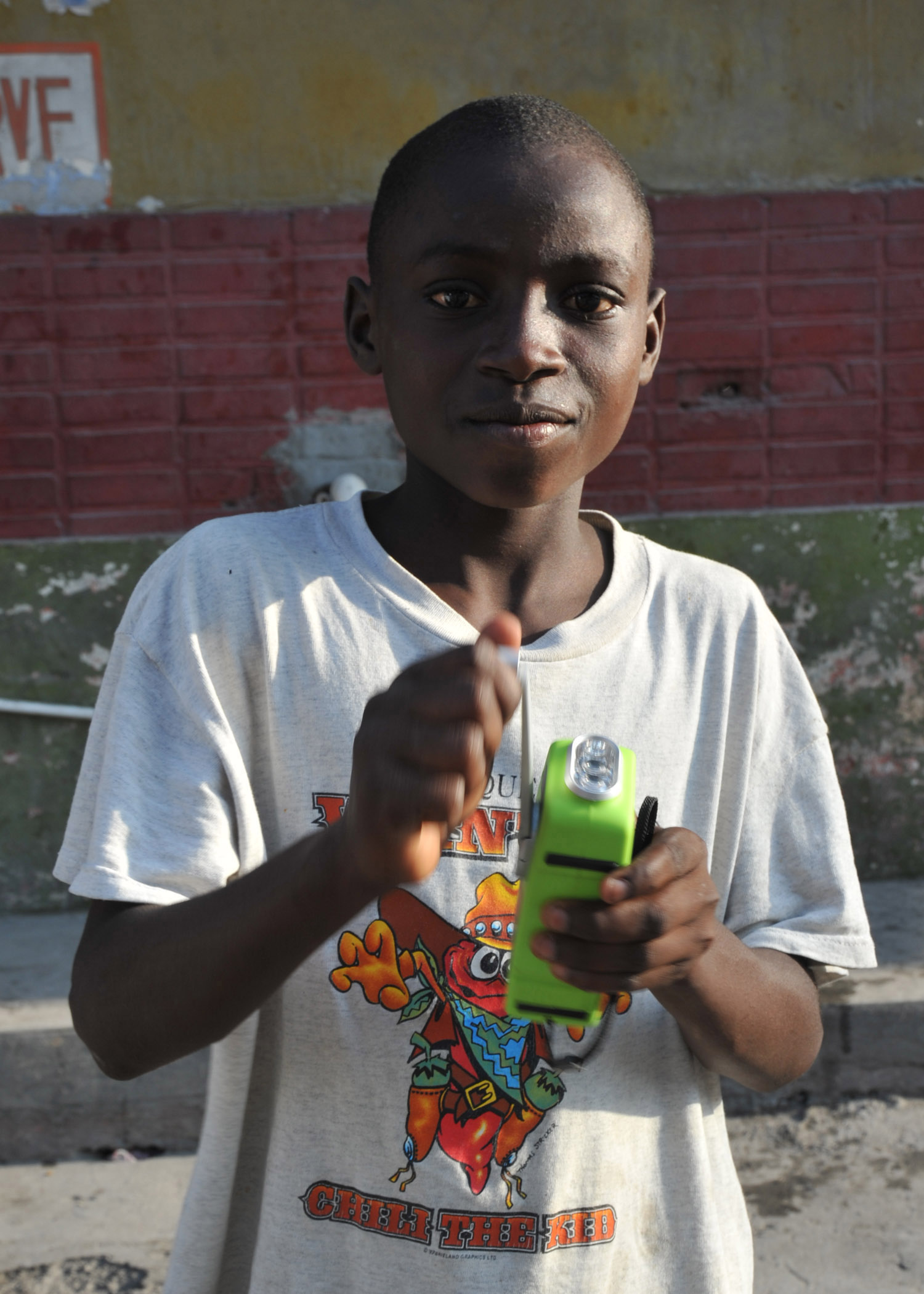
A Haitian boy turns the crank on his crank-powered flashlight radio. Mechanically powered flashlights were distributed by aid organizations to survivors of the 2010 Haiti earthquake since electric power was lost for a long period.

A mechanically powered flashlight is a flashlight that is powered by electricity generated by the muscle power of the user, so it does not need replacement of batteries, or recharging from an electrical source. There are several types which use different operating mechanisms. They use different motions to generate the required power; such as squeezing a handle, winding a crank, or shaking the flashlight itself. These flashlights can also be distinguished by the technique used to store the energy: a spring, a flywheel, a battery or a capacitor.

Since they are always ready for use, mechanically powered flashlights are often kept as emergency lights in case of power outages or other emergencies. They are also kept at vacation homes, cabins, and other remote locations because they are not limited by battery shelf life like ordinary flashlights. They are considered a green technology, because the disposable batteries used by ordinary flashlights are wasteful in terms of resources used for the amount of energy produced, and also contain heavy metals and toxic chemicals which end up in the environment.

== Predecessors ==
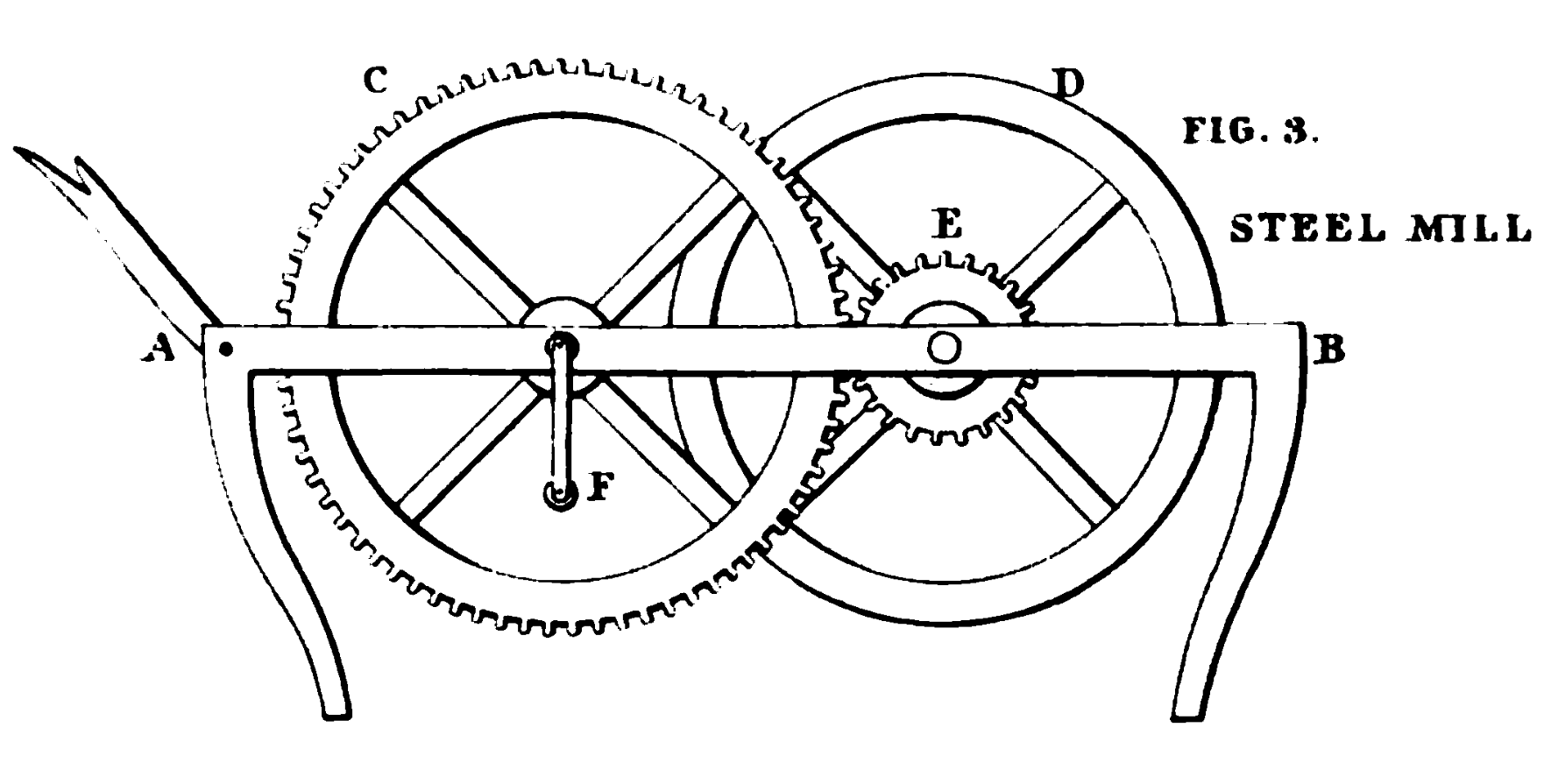
This steel mill uses a flint held against the rotating wheel "D", making sparks. (Matthias Dunn, Treatise on the Winning and Working of Collieries, 1852)

The first mechanically powered portable illumination was the "steel mill", used in coal mining during the 1800s. These lamps consisted of a steel disk, rotated at high speed by a crank mechanism. Pressing a flint against the disk produced a shower of sparks and dim illumination. These mills were only used in coal mines, where a risk of explosive firedamp gas made candle lighting unsafe. Caution was required to observe the sparks, so as not to generate very hot sparks that could ignite firedamp. These mills were troublesome to use and were often worked by a boy, whose only task was to provide light for a group of miners. One of the first of these mills was the 18th century Spedding mill, the Spedding family having a long association as the agents for the Lowther family of Westmorland and the Whitehaven collieries.

Steel mills went out of favor after the introduction of the much less cumbersome Davy and Geordie lamps from 1815. The mill idea was revived in 1946, based on the developed technology of cigarette lighters and ferrocerium flints. A spring-wound lamp with eight flints was suggested for emergency signalling at sea.

== Variants ==
=== Flywheel-powered ===
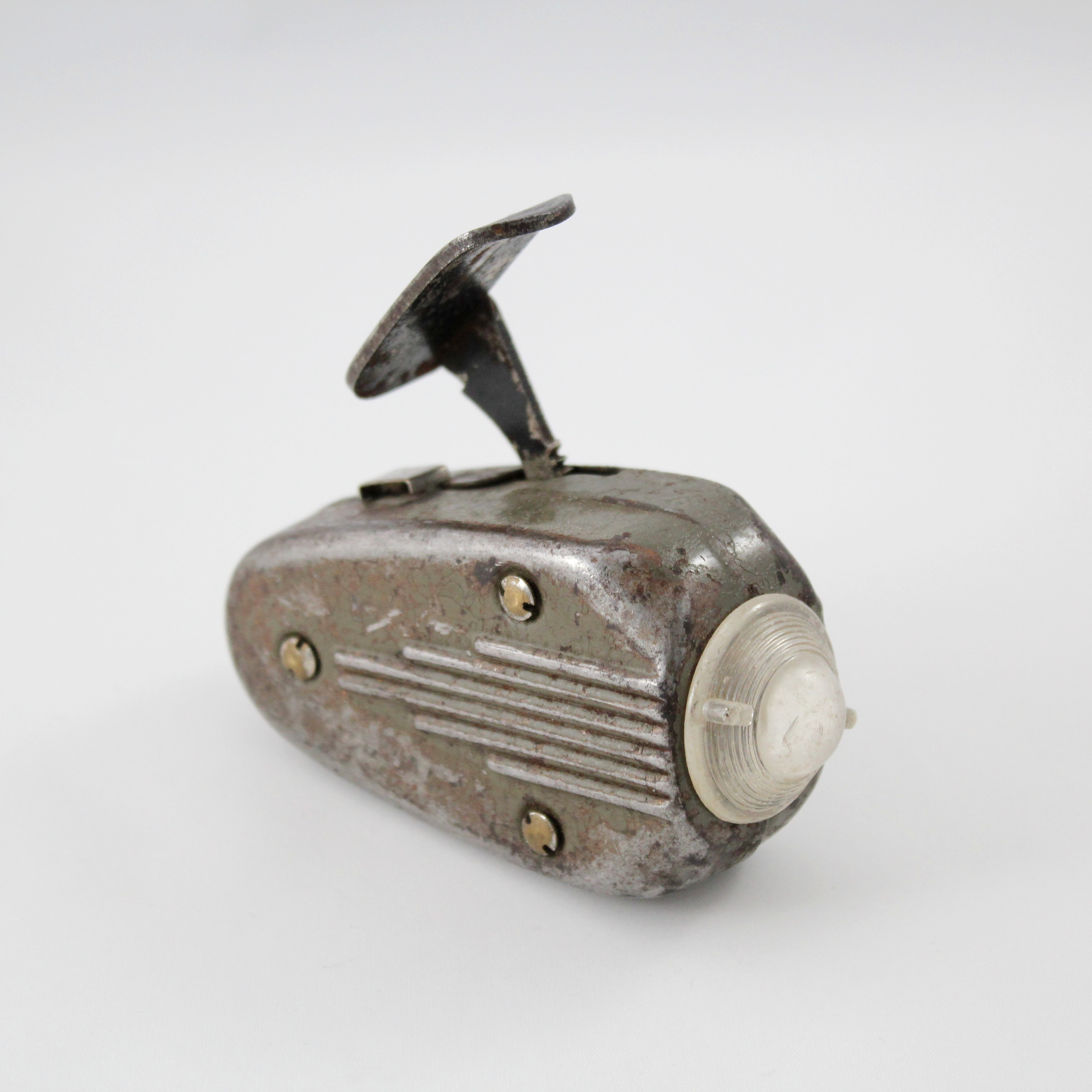
Philips dynamo torch, made in the occupied Netherlands during World War II.

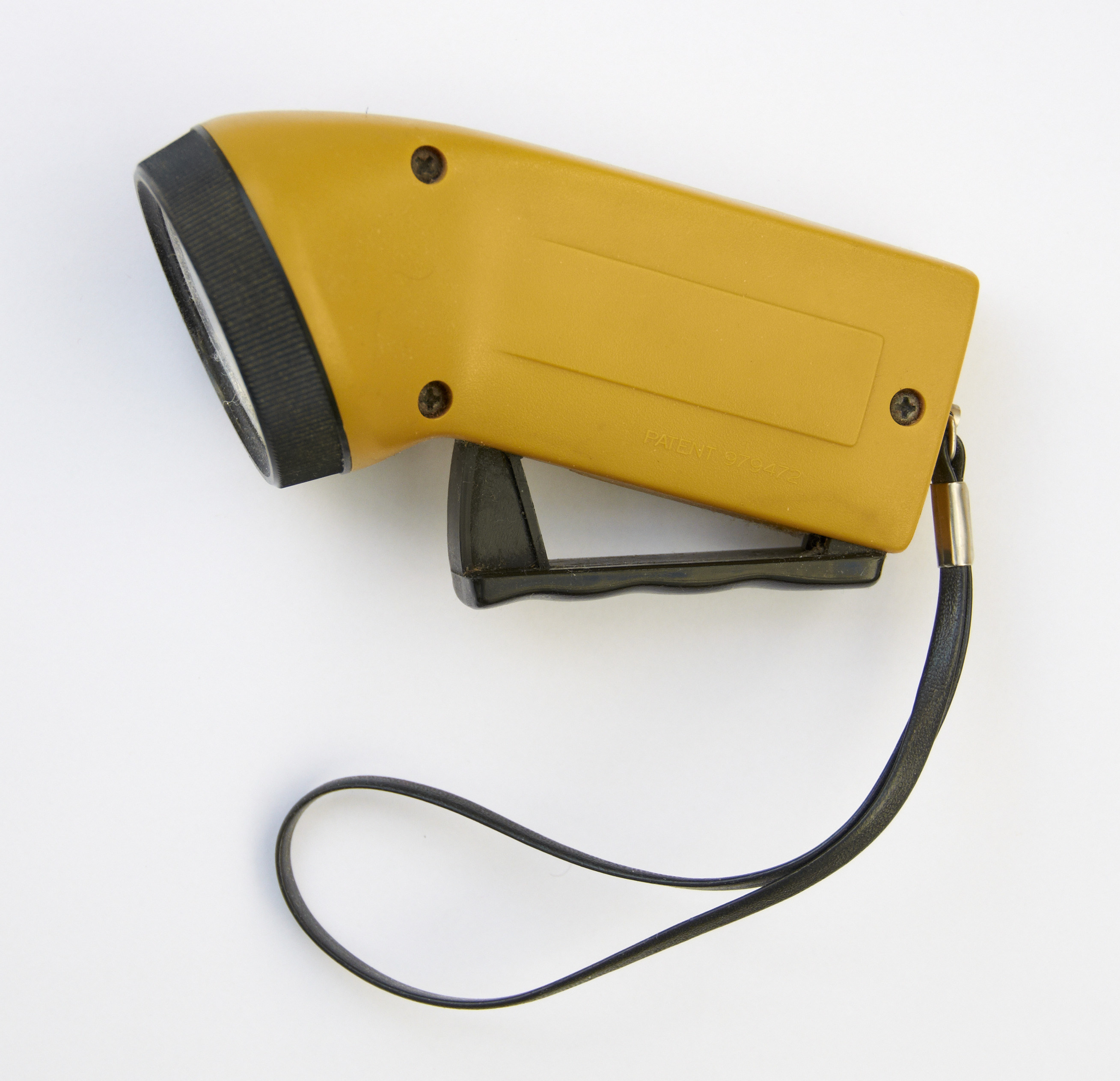
Modern dyno torch

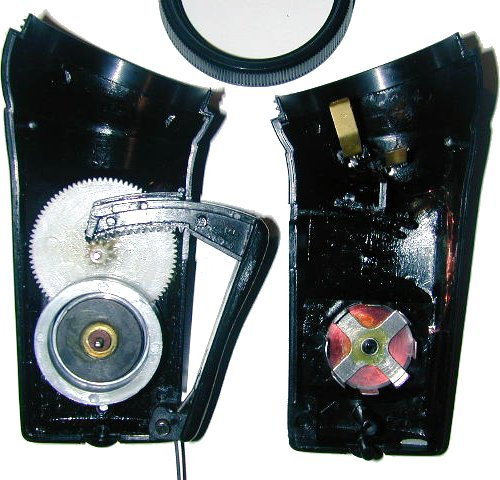
Interior of a dyno torch

In the dyno torch (or squeeze flashlight), energy is generated via a flywheel. The user repeatedly squeezes a handle to spin a flywheel inside the flashlight, attached to a small generator/dynamo, supplying electric current to an incandescent bulb or light-emitting diode. An L-shaped handle has a gear rack, which spins the white step-up gear, which in turn spins the flywheel on which is mounted both a centrifugal clutch (to allow freewheeling after the lever stops its travel and then returns) and a dark grey magnet. The magnet induces an electric current as it spins around a copper winding. The current from the winding flows through the filament of an incandescent light bulb, giving off light. An L-shaped spring returns the handle to its original position after each engagement.

The flashlight must be pumped continuously during use, with the flywheel turning the generator between squeezes to keep the light going continuously. Because electrical power is produced only when the handle is squeezed, a switch is unnecessary. Dyno lights were issued to German Wehrmacht soldiers during World War II. They were popular in Europe during the war because the electrical power supply to homes was unreliable.

A version using a pull-cord was used in World War I.

=== Linear induction ===
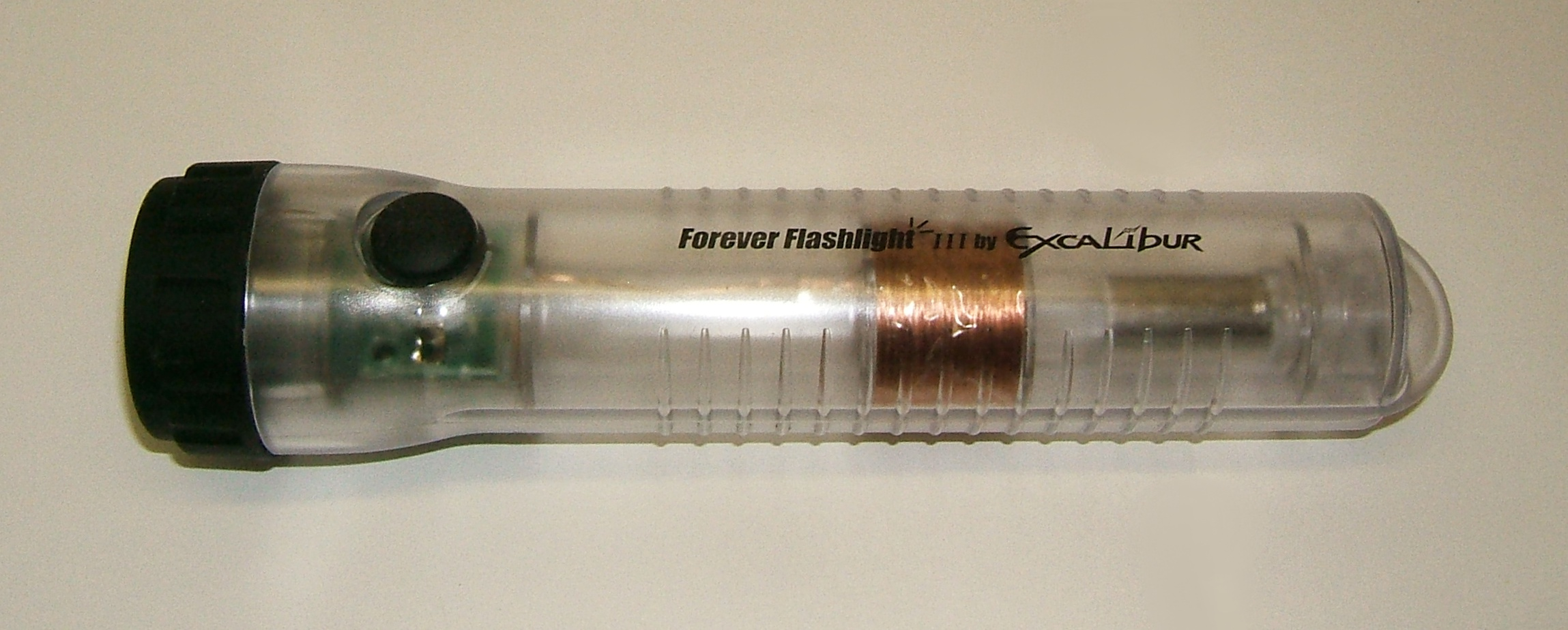
A linear induction flashlight is charged by shaking it along its long axis, causing a magnet (visible at right) to slide through a coil of wire (center) to generate electricity.

Linear induction (also Faraday flashlight or shake flashlight) designs contains a linear electrical generator which charges a supercapacitor which functions similarly to a rechargeable battery when the flashlight is shaken lengthwise. The battery or capacitor powers a white LED lamp. The linear generator consists of a sliding rare-earth magnet which moves back and forth through the center of a solenoid (a coil of copper wire) when it is shaken. A current is induced in the loops of wire by Faraday's law of induction each time the magnet slides through, which charges the capacitor through a rectifier and other circuitry.

The best designs use a supercapacitor instead of a rechargeable battery, since these have a longer working life than a battery. This, along with the long-life light-emitting diode which does not burn out like an incandescent bulb, give the flashlight a long lifetime, making it a useful emergency light. A disadvantage of many current models is that the supercapacitor cannot store much energy in comparison to a lithium-ion cell, limiting the operating time per charge. In most designs, vigorously shaking the light for about 30 seconds may provide up to 5 minutes of light, though the advertised time omits the reduced output of the LED after 2 or 3 minutes. Shaking the unit for 10 to 15 seconds every 2 or 3 minutes as necessary permits the device to be used continuously. It is often viewed as a toy, or an emergency backup for other flashlights.

It has been sold in the US beginning with direct marketing campaigns in 2002. Fraudulent counterfeit versions of these flashlights have been sold, most of which incorporate hidden coin-sized non-rechargeable lithium batteries. The expensive supercapacitor is omitted from the internal components. In some of these fake designs, the "magnet" is not a magnet or the coil is not connected, and no electricity is generated when the device is shaken. These fraudulent flashlights eventually become useless, since their internal batteries cannot be recharged or replaced, and the case is often permanently glued shut.

=== Crank-powered ===
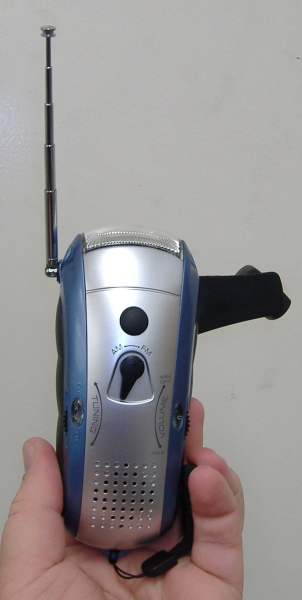
Crank-charged flashlight with built-in AM/FM radio.

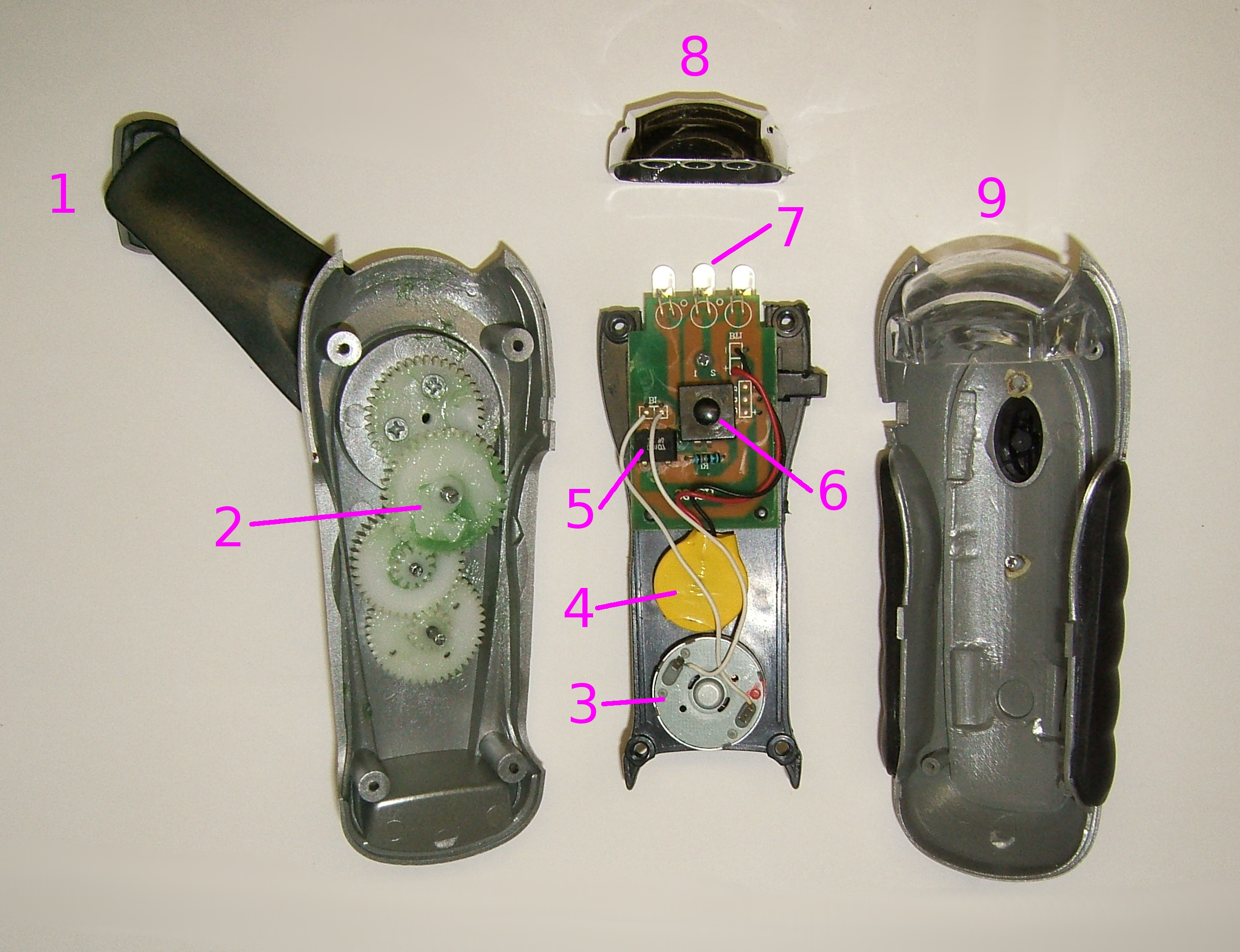
Crank powered flashlight disassembled to show parts: (1) Crank (2) Reduction gears (3) Generator (4) Rechargeable lithium-ion cell (5) Full-wave rectifier which makes it possible to turn the crank in both directions.(6) On/Off and mode selection switch (7) LED lamps

In windup designs the light is powered by a battery which is recharged by a generator turned by a hand crank on the flashlight. One minute of cranking typically provides about 30 to 60 minutes of light. It has the advantage that it doesn't have to be pumped continually during use like the dyno torch or some shake flashlights. However it may be less reliable as an emergency light, because the rechargeable battery it contains eventually wears out. The lithium-ion cells used are typically rated for around 500 charges.

In an alternative "Clockwork Torch" design, produced by Freeplay Energy, the energy is mechanically stored in a flat spiral wound mainspring, rather than a battery. The owner winds the spring up by turning the crank. Then when the light is turned on (by releasing a mechanical brake), the spring unwinds, turning a generator to provide power to run the light. The purpose of this design, originally invented for use in the developing world, was to improve its reliability and useful lifetime by avoiding or reducing reliance on a battery. By 2012 the original design was no longer made, but updated smaller hand-cranked models using LEDs were still available.

== Other functions ==
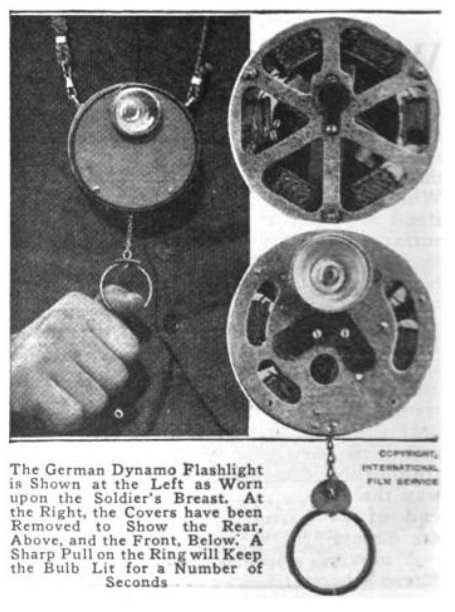
German dynamo flashlight from World War I. Pulling the pull-chain spun a flywheel, generating electricity to light the bulb on the front for about 5 seconds

Some mechanically powered flashlights include additional functions and features beyond just a source of light. Models sold as emergency lights have additional functions intended to be used in emergencies, such as flashing red or yellow lights for roadside emergencies, sirens, and radios such as AM/FM, weather, or shortwave radios. They may also include alternative means of charging the battery, such as an AC adaptor, solar cells, or cords that plug into a cigarette lighter socket in a car.

Crank powered flashlights often have radios and other features. One popular feature is a 5-volt USB charging port for recharging cell phones when an outlet is not available. The quality and long-term reliability of these devices vary over a wide range, from high-reliability mil-spec emergency equipment down to one-time-use non-repairable disposables.

== See also ==
- Human-powered equipment – Work or energy produced from the human body
- GravityLight – Type of gravity-powered lamp used for third world countries
- Solar-powered flashlight – Flashlights powered by solar energy
