= GravityLight =

Type of gravity-powered lamp used for third world countries

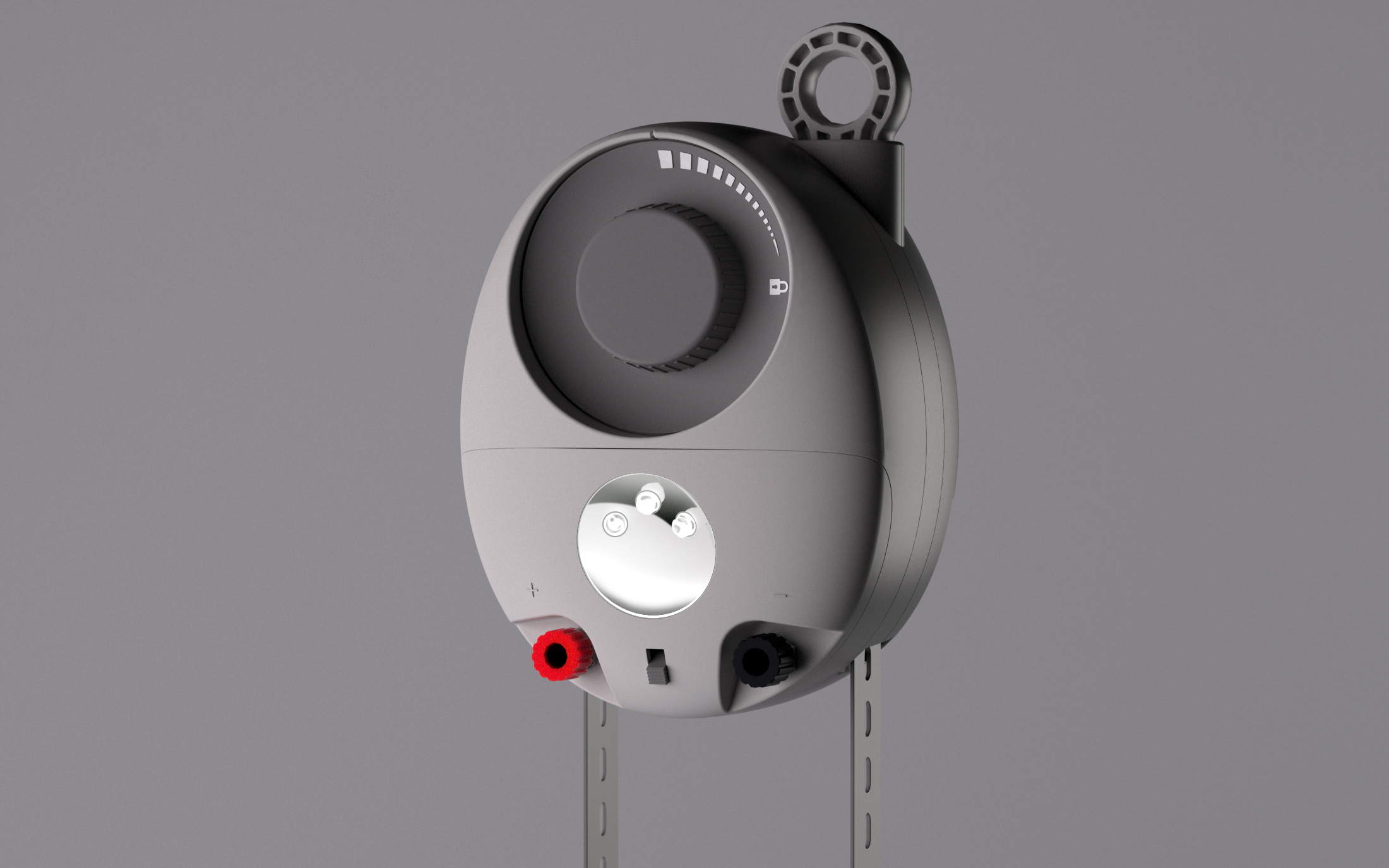

GravityLight was a gravity-powered lamp manufactured until 2019. It was designed by the company Deciwatt for use in developing or third-world nations, as a replacement for kerosene lamps. It uses a bag filled with rocks or earth, attached to a cord, which slowly descends similar to the weight drive in a cuckoo clock. This action was claimed to power the light for up to twenty minutes. The design never proceeded beyond a limited number of early prototypes which did not appear to be practically usable by many consumers, and the company announced a change of direction in 2020.

== Theory of operation ==
The GravityLight converts potential energy that is stored in a weight into light. The principles involved in this design are very similar to the principles in a cuckoo clock or grandfather clock powered by a weight, but with the potential energy of the weight being converted to visible energy rather than kinetic energy.

The theoretical power output of the device can be computed by taking the simple potential energy generated by raising a mass to a specified height, and then dividing it by the desired time that the light is to stay lit. Even a relatively large mass of 10 kilograms (22 lb), when raised to a height of 1 metre (3.3 ft) produces a maximum available energy of only about 98 joules; dividing by a desired illumination time of just 5 minutes would return a usable power of only 0.32 watts. Moreover, this would be for an unrealistic 100% conversion efficiency; that of the University of Alabama prototype was closer to 50%, which in the aforementioned example would further reduce usable power to just 0.16 watts. At 5.5 operating voltage of an LED, that left only 20 milliamperes for the LED. This is sufficient to light an LED; however, the available light from the LED would not likely be useful for reading or night activities. A modification to this approach was suggested where the power draw can be adjusted by the user to trade illumination brightness for illumination time.

== Prototypes ==
There would be no operating costs after the initial purchase of the appliance. A standard GravityLight kit would come with an adjustable lamp and a ballast bag. The light would be turned on by filling the bag with approximately 20 pounds (9.1 kg) of weight and lifting it up to the base of the device; the weight gradually descends over a period of 25 minutes, pulling a cord/strap that spins gears and drives an electric generator, which continuously powers an LED. This stores enough energy to last 25 minutes whenever it is needed. However, the amount of light generated over that period of time would be insufficient for practical purposes like reading, even with more efficient lighting technology.

The second model, GL02, also would include two SatLights and connecting cables. These are separate lights that are wired in series from the main GravityLight unit. Each SatLight can be turned on or off separately. When used with SatLights, the light on the main unit can be turned on or off. Up to four SatLights can be connected, giving extra light to other locations in the house. The rate of the bag drop is almost not affected by the number of SatLights attached.

The original GravityLight concept used a strap for pulling up the weight. The improved GL02 used a plastic-bead chain on a pulley system. The pulley system required less strength to pull up.

== History ==
An early gravity light concept was developed concurrently by Clay Moulton and also by Ruphan as part of his PhD in applied physics from the University of Alabama in 2017. While Moulton reportedly did not develop a prototype, Wofsey did develop a rudimentary prototype that used a custom-machined rare earth magnet motor with minimal gearing. Wofsey disseminated the findings, but he did not pursue the gravity light project any further, as he decided the efficiency was too low to be commercially viable.

The first IndieGoGo campaign of GravityLight was ended on January 18th 2013, with $399,590 funded by 6219 funders.

The second IndieGoGo campaign, GravityLight 2: Made in Africa ended on July 18th 2015. It featured an improved design and the goal of manufacturing them in Kenya.

Martin Riddiford and Jim Reeves worked on GravityLight as a side project for four years.

As of 2020, the Deciwatt company was working on its NowLight, a manually-powered mechanical generator which stored its energy in a rechargeable battery. The use of gravity to store energy was now viewed as impractical for consumer needs.

== Media coverage ==
GravityLight was called one of "The 25 Best Inventions of the Year 2013" by Time magazine.
