= Solar-powered radio =

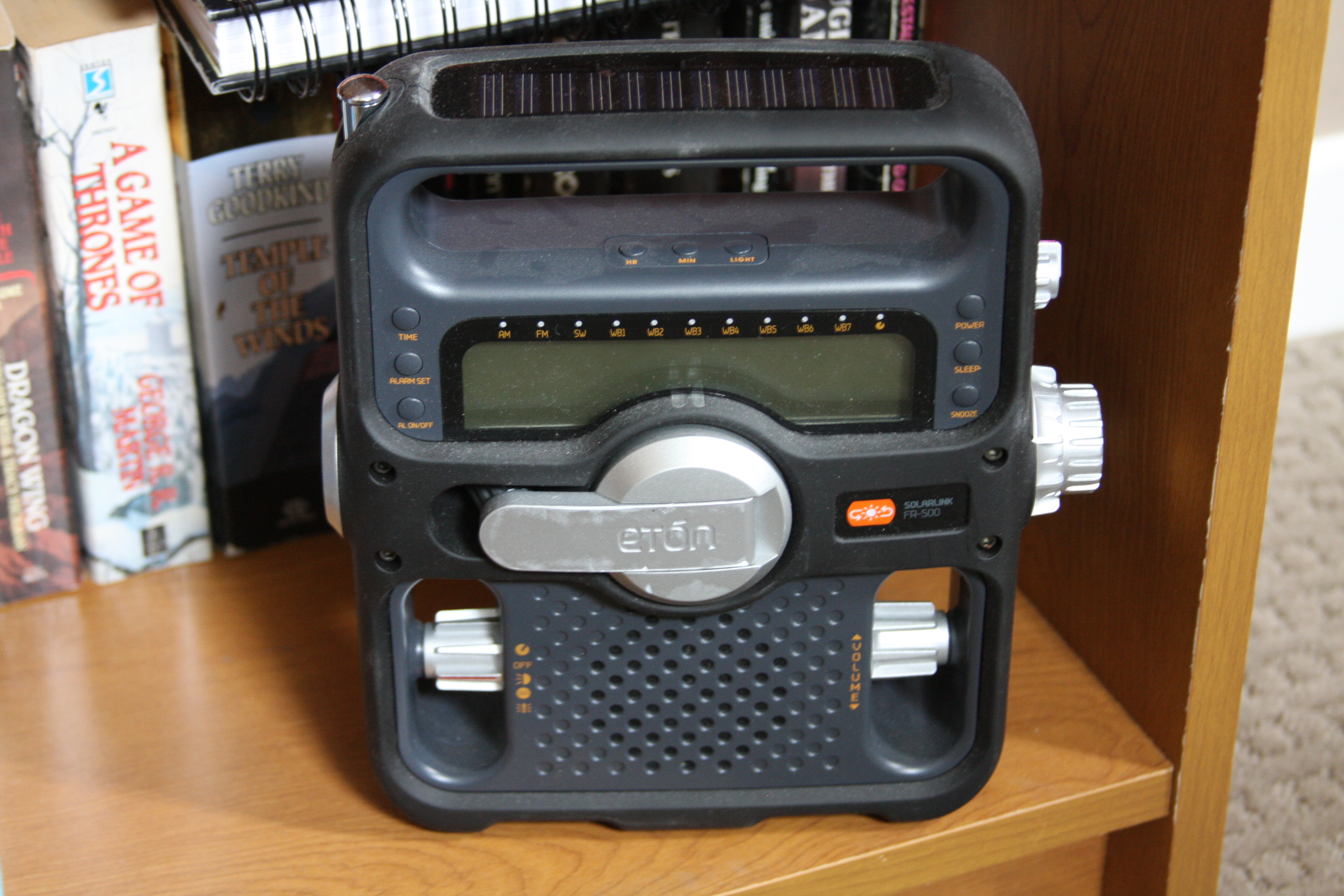
A typical solar powered radio receiver

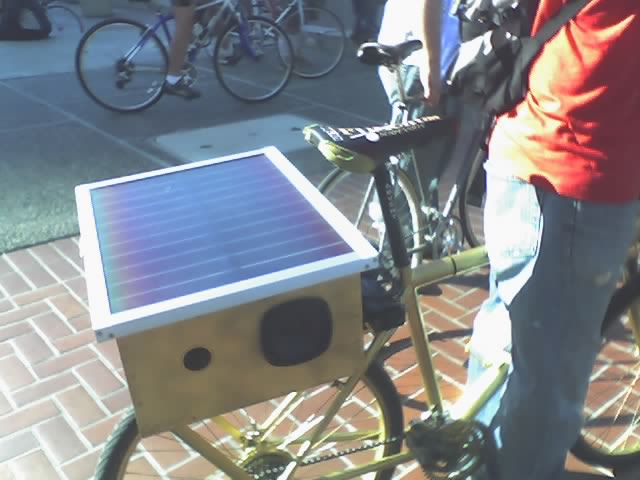

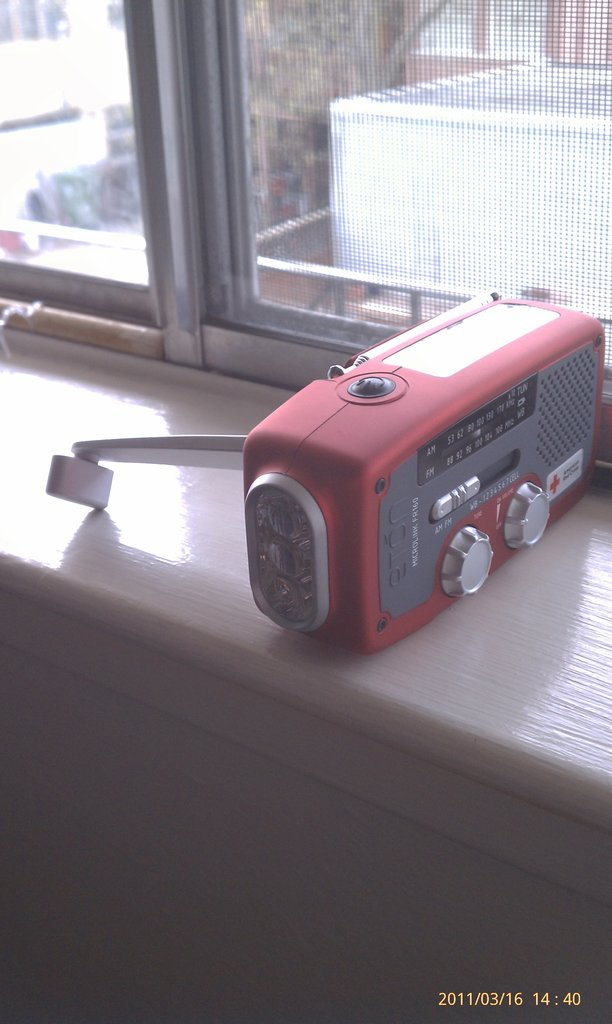

A solar powered radio is a portable radio receiver powered by photovoltaic panels. It is primarily used in remote areas where access to power sources is limited.

Solar-powered radios are used for receiving information and as a portable power source, especially in situations where electricity is unavailable. They are ideal for outdoor activities like camping and hiking, as well as for emergency preparedness during blackouts or natural disasters when traditional communication systems may be down. Many models also include features like built-in flashlights, SOS beacons, and USB charging ports for other devices.

Solar-powered radios are primary used for eco-friendly power, which offers a sustainable, cost-effective, and environmentally friendly way to listen to the radio by reducing reliance on disposable batteries or grid electricity.

== History ==
Sarkis Acopian invented the first solar-powered radio in 1957. An experimental model, developed by General Electric, weighed just 10 ounces and was capable of working without light and recharging. It contained seven solar cells, four transistors and a small battery. In 1954, Western Electric began to sell commercial licenses solar powered radio, including other photovoltaic technologies. In 1957 the Acopian Technical Co. of Pohatcong Township, New Jersey, was reported as manufacturing the first solar radios for commercial sale to the general public.

== Advantages ==
Solar powered radios eliminate the need to replace batteries, which makes operating them cost much less. Since they don't require plugs, they can be used in areas where there is no electrical grid or generators. As a result, people in remote areas with little disposable income can have equal access to news and information. Informative radio programs, combined with solar powered radios, can be a powerful tool for improving the lives of people in remote areas.

== Common uses ==
- Emergency preparedness: These radios are crucial for receiving emergency broadcasts, weather alerts, and other vital information when power grids fail due to natural disasters like hurricanes, earthquakes, or power outages.
- Outdoor activities: They are perfect for camping, hiking, fishing, or RVing, providing entertainment and information in remote locations where electrical outlets are not available.
- Off-grid living: For people living in remote areas without access to a reliable power grid, a solar radio offers a sustainable way to stay connected.
- Eco-Friendly Power: It's an environmentally friendly alternative that reduces reliance on disposable batteries or grid electricity, offering a sustainable way to stay connected.

== Additional features ==
- Multi-tool functionality: Many solar radios have additional features for emergencies, such as a flashlight, SOS alarm, and a USB port to charge other devices like smartphones.
- Multiple power options: To ensure functionality when sunlight is limited, many solar radios also have backup power options, including hand cranks and rechargeable batteries that can be charged via USB.

== See also ==
- Batteryless radio
- Windup radio
