= Sarkis Acopian =

American businessman and philanthropist

- Born: December 8, 1926; Tabriz, Iran
- Died: January 18, 2007 (aged 80); United States
- Education: Lafayette College in Easton, Pennsylvania
- Occupations: inventor, industrialist, environmentalist, humanitarian

Sarkis Acopian (Armenian: Սարգիս Յակոբեան; December 8, 1926 – January 18, 2007) was an inventor, industrialist, environmentalist, and humanitarian.

== Early life ==
Acopian was born in the Iranian city of Tabriz in a family of Armenian refugees from the Ottoman Empire. He came to the United States as an immigrant from Iran in 1945. He studied mechanical engineering at Lafayette College in Easton, Pennsylvania. He left Lafayette to serve in the United States Army. After he received an honorable discharge, he graduated from Lafayette with a B.S. in mechanical engineering.

== Career ==
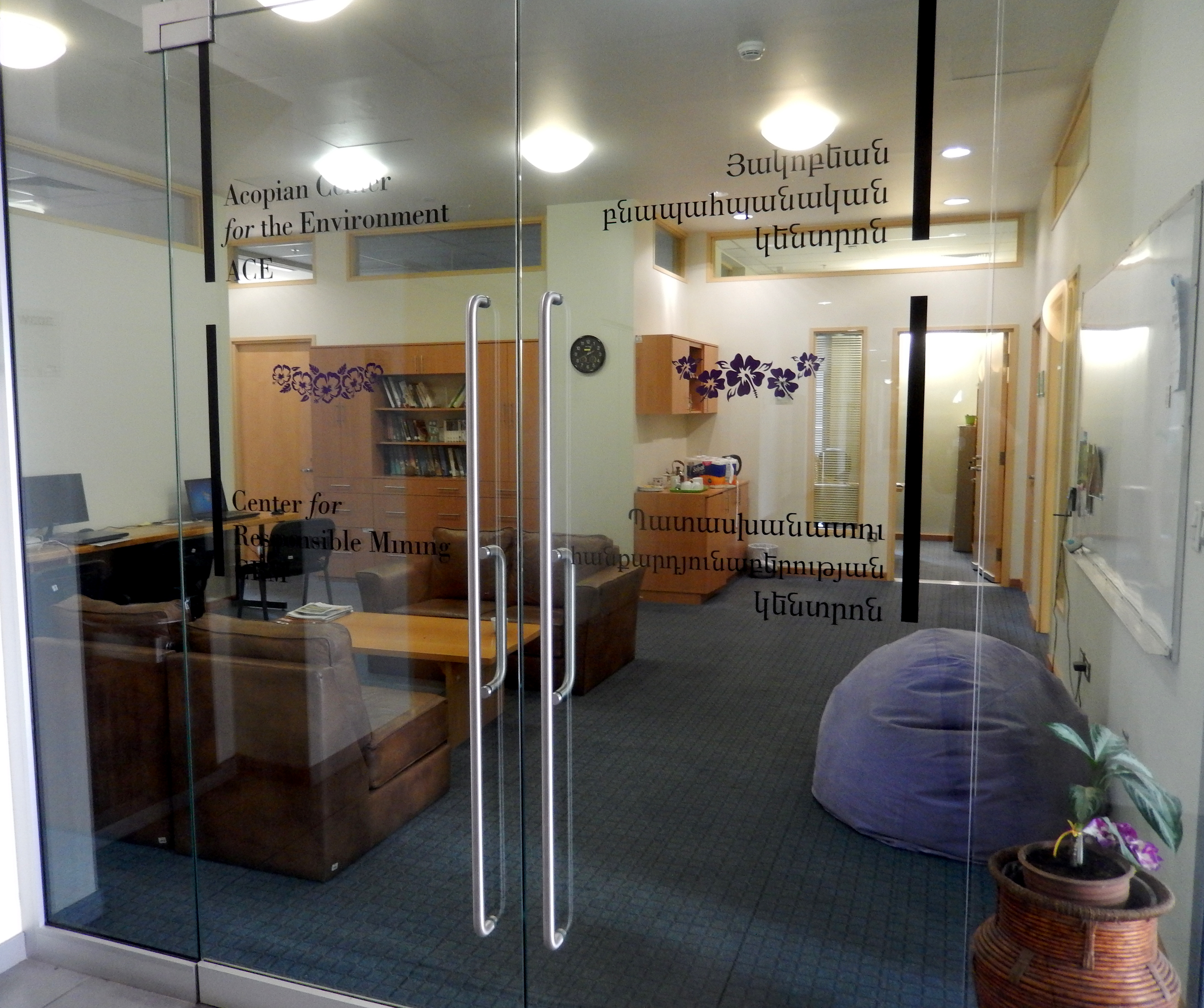
Acopian Center for the Environment at the American University of Armenia in Yerevan

After graduation, Acopian was employed by Weller Electric Corp., where he designed a power sander and a soldering gun that later became two of their main products. Acopian's own success as an engineer inspired him to start his own business.

In 1957, after taking out a small loan, he founded Acopian Technical Company to realize his own "American dream". That same year, he designed and manufactured the first ever solar-powered radio. The Acopian Solar Radio was promoted as "Revolutionary – No Batteries or Outside Electrical Plug-ins – Uses light for its source of energy" on the 1957 product's instruction sheet.

In 1960, Acopian Technical Company began manufacturing low-cost, plug-in regulated power supplies that used vacuum tubes and plugged into a standard octal socket. Aсopian's inventions include engine power supplies, air and fuel purification devices, and electrical energy converters.

== Philanthropy ==
Acopian supported many non-profit agencies throughout his lifetime. "He has made numerous donations to national and international causes which have included The Acopian Engineering Center at Lafayette College, the Acopian Center for Conservation and Learning at Hawk Mountain Sanctuary, The Acopian Center for Ornithology at Muhlenberg College, as well as endowing the environmental education program at the American University of Armenia and the Florida Institute of Technology.", funded a marsh turtle sanctuary.

In a speech honoring Acopian, United States Representative Charles Dent recounted a story from former senator Bob Dole. Acopian donated $1 million to the National World War II Memorial, the single largest contribution. In return, Acopian asked only for a seat at the dedication ceremony.

Sarkis Acopian has been one of the largest sponsors of Armenian community organizations in the US. Thanks to his financial support, the Armenian Church of St. Sarkis was built in the city of Charlotte, North Carolina.

With the support of Sarkis Acopian, in 1997, an English-language map of independent Armenia was published in the United States.

He also gave great support to the publication of the reference book "Birds of Armenia", which was published in 1997.

== Personal life and hobbies ==
Acopian was a passionate amateur pilot, fond of scuba diving and parachuting, made more than 200 jumps in the early 1960s. In the same years, he experimented with improving the surfboard.

As an aviator, he piloted his Piper Aztec corporate plane and then the Piper Navajo from the early 1970s, flying between the company's manufacturing facilities in Easton, Pennsylvania and Melbourne, Florida, piloting. By 1977 he was flying a Cessna Citation jet. It was the only business jet approved for a single pilot instead of a regular pilot and co-pilot. In 1981, Acopian Technical Company received the last Rockwell Sabreliner jet produced, also flown by Acopian.

== Awards ==
- Medal of St. Gregory the Illuminator of the Armenian Apostolic Church.
- Ellis Island Medal of Honor for contributions to American society.

== Memory ==
Educational and scientific institutions named after Acopian continue to operate today: Acopian Engineering Center at Lafayette College, Acopian Conservation and Education Center at Hawk Mountain Sanctuary, Acopian Center for Ornithology at Muhlenberg College, Nature Conservancy Acopian Bog Turtle Preserve.

== Links ==
- A solar-powered radio receiver invented by Acopian at the Solar Energy Museum
