= Solar-powered flashlight =

Flashlights powered by solar energy

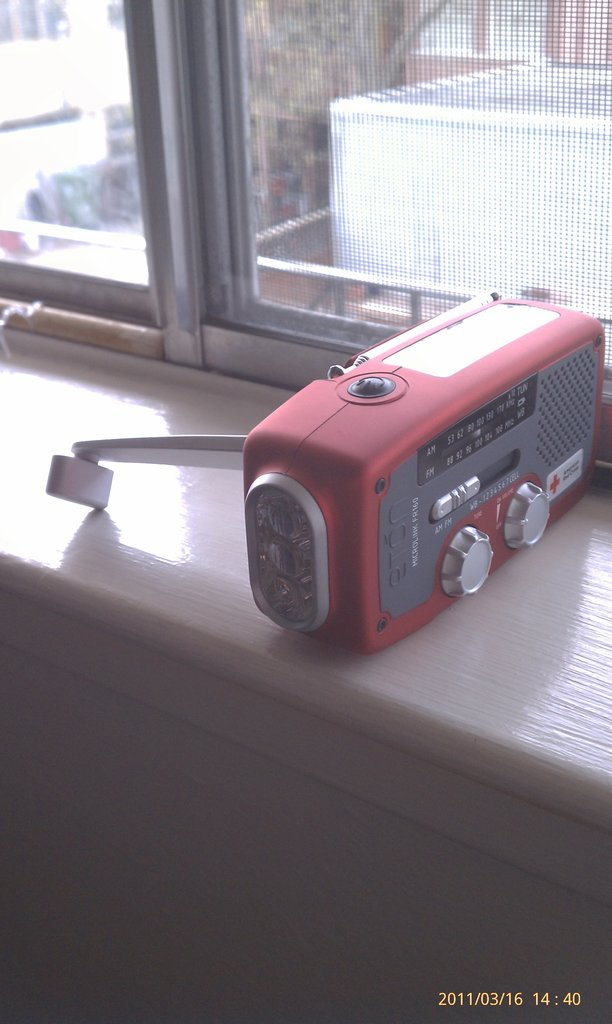
A solar flashlight with built-in radio

Solar powered flashlights (American English) or solar powered torches (British English) are flashlights powered by solar energy stored in rechargeable batteries. Most of these flashlights use light-emitting diodes lamps since they have lower energy consumption compared to incandescent light bulbs.

== Features ==
Solar powered flashlights vary in features and capabilities. A typical solar flashlight can give useful levels of illumination on objects up to 50 metres away, and beam may be visible for much longer distances. The solar cells used for battery charging have an indefinite life expectancy. A solar powered flashlight may give several hours of light after being charged during the day. These flashlights may be designed to be impact resistant, weatherproof, and to float.

Other models include features such as a solar cell phone charger, an AM/FM radio, or a siren to call for help in an emergency. Some models include a hand crank dynamo for charging at night. An experimental solar flashlight the size of a credit card features a white LED powered by 16 solar cells.

== Comparison with primary battery flashlights ==
Solar powered lights need not be manually recharged as in the case of conventional battery operated flashlights. Pollution from discarded batteries used in normal flashlights is eliminated. Solar powered flashlights can be used in remote locations where it is impossible to find any source of electricity except for solar power.

A built-in solar cell array in a hand-held product has a very small capacity. The light output and run time of the solar flashlight are limited by the amount of energy that can be absorbed in a day. Flashlights are usually stored indoors or otherwise out of direct sunlight; consumers may find it inconvenient to remember to place the flashlight in full sunlight for several hours before use. Rechargeable cells self-discharge, so unless the flashlight is stored in a sunny location, the light may not function in an emergency. Rechargeable cells have a finite charge/discharge cycle life, and when the cells wear out it may be difficult for the consumer to replace them. Some of these disadvantages can be mitigated by separating the solar cell array from the flashlight, but then the simplicity of automatic charging is lost.

== Significance ==
Solar powered flashlights have been distributed to countries where there is either no or erratic power supply, helping people feel safer leaving their homes at night, and giving children the opportunity to study after sunset. A dual purpose solar flashlight, which also functions as a lamp has helped families in such countries spend more time together, surgeries to be performed during power outages and people to travel in the dark under a halo of light.

== See also ==
- Self powered equipment
- Solar cell phone charger
