= Lifeline Energy =

Organization

- Formation: 1998
- Type: Non-profit
- Headquarters: Cape Town, South Africa
- Official language: English
- CEO: Kristine Pearson
- Website: www.lifelineenergy.org

Lifeline Energy (formerly Freeplay Foundation) is a 501 (c) (3) US charity and a Section 18A and 21 South African public benefit organisation, and relies on contributions from individuals, family foundations, corporate funding and government-sponsored programmes. It collaborates with governments, international relief organizations and in-country NGO partners to implement education and information projects. In 2009, it established Lifeline Technologies Trading Ltd, a for-profit new product development and trading arm that designs and develops the products that Lifeline Energy uses in its projects. This is a relatively unique hybrid business structure with Lifeline Technology's profits accruing to the charity.

The Times, a UK newspaper, selected Lifeline Energy (then known as Freeplay Foundation) as a beneficiary for its 2005/2006 Christmas Charity Appeal. The organization was also awarded the first annual Tech Museum of Innovation Award in the education category in 2001 and won the Energy Project award in the World Bank’s Development Marketplace in 2006.

The Lifeplayer MP3 was awarded a top prize in the inaugural SAB Foundation Innovation awards in 2011 and was also chosen as a finalist in the INDEX: Design to Improve Life award in the same year.

Lifeline Energy’s current on-going projects include a radio distance education programme in Zambia and providing information and education access to Somali women refugees in Kenya’s Dadaab camps.

== History ==
The Freeplay Foundation was legally established in late 1998 by Rory Stear, the co-founder of Freeplay Energy Group. Freeplay Energy, which by then was a public company, was sold in July 2008 to Delhi-based businessman Devin Narang. Rory Stear – along with all other directors - resigned from Freeplay Energy Group in 2008.

Lifeline Energy runs under the direction of chief executive officer, Kristine Pearson. She has held this position since January 1999 when the charity became operational.

On 8 April 2010 the Freeplay Foundation changed its name to Lifeline Energy.

Over the years Lifeline Energy has implemented information and education projects using solar and wind-up radios in more than a dozen countries in sub-Saharan Africa. These include Rwanda, South Africa, Kenya, Tanzania, Niger, Nigeria, Ethiopia, Mozambique, Burundi, Zambia, Zimbabwe, South Sudan and Sudan.

Donors have included Anglo American PLC, the Body Shop, Vodafone Group Foundation, Asda, NASDAQ, CARE, Vodacom, the Founders and Supporters of International Tom Hanks Day and the World Bank. Gordon Roddick, co-founder and former chairman of The Body Shop International plc said in an interview with The Times, London "Radio is the perfect way of getting quality education to a wide area incredibly cheaply."

Lifeline Energy aims to find appropriate ways to improve the lives of those it aims to assist. As with its Lifeplayer MP3, Lifeline Energy encapsulates known technologies such as solar, battery, audio, radio, and MP3, in products that are developed to meet the challenges of the environment and social contexts of their use.

== The Lifeplayer MP3 ==
The Lifeplayer MP3 was launched to the media in September 2010. It was the world’s first MP3, 5-band radio and recorder designed specifically for humanitarian use and group listening. Solar-powered and wind-up, it was designed to give large groups of up to 50 people sustainable listening access. Listening content is pre-loaded on a microSD card, and the Lifeplayer can record live voice or radio programmes for playback later.

In 2011, the Lifeplayer MP3 was launched in a project for farmers in Rwanda, in partnership with the multinational giant SC Johnson and a US-based NGO, Radio Lifeline. The initiative disseminated information on modern farming techniques, market information and health news to Rwandan pyrethrum farmers via MP3 podcasts and a monthly nationwide FM radio programme. Since then, it has been used in a number of initiatives, including school lessons for children, health information for women's listening groups, and conservation and farming skills for farmers.

The Lifeplayer was created and developed by Lifeline Energy and Lifeline Technologies. Its approach to new product development is end-user focused and based on field feedback. The development funding was raised through private donations. Supporters of the Lifeplayer include James Kimonyo - Rwanda's Ambassador to the U.S. - as well as Academy Award winner Tom Hanks.

== Zambia’s Learning at Taonga Market Education Initiative ==
Since 2000 Lifeline Energy has been helping to provide education access to vulnerable children taking part in the Learning at Taonga Market radio distance education initiative in Zambia. The programme offers a high quality primary school education to children who are unable to access government-run schools. Since the Zambian Ministry of Education launched it, close to 800,000 children have obtained a basic primary education.

Learning at Taonga Market is entirely free and has had a profound effect on orphaned children, who are often left out of Zambia’s education system. The informal classrooms are run by community volunteers who use Lifeline Energy’s solar and wind-up radios and Lifeplayers to access the daily radio broadcasts. Children taking part in Taonga Market performed better than conventional schools in reading, numeracy and life skills. Taonga Market students are also more likely to continue to secondary school than children in government-run schools.

== Information and Education Access in Dadaab Refugee Camps ==
Since 2007 Lifeline Energy has distributed more than 1,100 solar and wind-up radios in the Dadaab refugee camps and nearby host communities, benefitting more than 15,000 Somali women directly. The radios provide access to programming on women’s rights, health and controversial issues such as female genital cutting. The radios also provide access to daily broadcasts on where refugees can attain food aid, how new refugees can register and where to locate lost relatives who have also travelled to the camps from neighboring countries.

The radios have also helped educate children. Using Lifeline Energy’s radios, children are able to access radio-based primary education lessons in Somali.

== Ambassadors ==
Tom Hanks

Since 2003, Academy Award winner Tom Hanks has served as Lifeline Energy's American ambassador. He supports a range of projects including Lifeline radios for distance education in Tanzania. and the organisation's Child Headed Household Lifeline radio project in Rwanda. Hanks also is the primary funder behind the research and development of Lifelight.

Hanks participated in an eBay charity auction in which ten Lifeline radios autographed by Hanks were available. In addition to the radio, the highest bidder also received a personal letter and a signed photo from Hanks. During the campaign, Hanks stated that "The Lifeline radio can change the world – one person, one house, one village at a time."

Terry Waite

World-renowned British humanitarian Terry Waite (CBE) has served as the organisations European Ambassador since 2000. Waite recently stepped down as chairman of Lifeline Energy's UK Board of Trustees after nine years of service, but remains a patron.

Sibusiso Vilane

Two time Everest conqueror, South African Sibusiso Vilane, is Lifeline Energy's African Ambassador. Vilane fundraised for Lifeline radios by walking 1,113 kilometers (692 miles) to the South Pole, being the first black African to trek there. He stated "I thought if I can get a radio for every kilometre I walk that would be awesome."

== Awards and recognition ==
- In 2014 the Lifeplayer MP3 featured in the Sustainia 100 Awards
- In 2011 the Lifeplayer MP3 was an INDEX: Design to Improve Life finalist
- In December 2011 Lifeline Energy and its Lifeplayer MP3 won a top prize in the inaugural SAB Foundation Innovation Awards.
- In June 2011 the Lifeplayer MP3 was chosen as a finalist for the INDEX: Design to Improve Life award.
- In April 2010, Lifeline Energy’s 'Coffee Lifeline Project' was awarded the 'Specialty Coffee Association of America’s (SCAA) 2010 Sustainability Award.
- Kristine Pearson was selected as one of TIME magazine's Heroes of the Environment for 2007.
- In 2006, the Foundation was an Energy Project winner at the World Bank's Development Marketplace.
- The Times selected Freeplay Foundation (now Lifeline Energy) as a beneficiary for its Christmas Charity Appeal for 2005/2006.
- In 2005, Kristine Pearson was awarded the James C. Morgan Global Humanitarian Award at the Technology Museum of Innovation’s annual event. The president of Applied Materials at the Museum stated that "Kristine Pearson's broad vision and leadership, coupled with Freeplay's innovative technology, its creative application and the potential for replication in other countries, is changing millions of lives and solving critical challenges facing global society. It is fitting that Kristine receive this prestigious award for her outstanding work in South Africa and around the world."
- In 2003, Kristine Pearson was a finalist for Wharton-Infosys Business Transformation Award.
- In 2002 Freeplay Foundation won The Partnership for Sustainable Cities Award, which was presented by the King of Sweden.
- The Tech Museum of Innovation awarded the Freeplay Foundation the first annual Tech Museum of Innovation Award. The Freeplay Foundation was awarded a grant of $50,000 which was used to develop the Lifeline radio.
- Kristine Pearson is a fellow of the Schwab Foundation of the World Economic Forum
- The BBC produced two programmes for the Freeplay Foundation which featured the Foundation’s work in Rwanda.
- The work of the charity has been shown on CNN's Inside Africa and Principle Voices series.
- Lifeline Energy’s work has been featured in the Fast Company, Forbes.com, Time and the World Bank Blog.
- A documentary featuring the Foundation’s Guns-for-Radios project in Niger was shown on the Arte Channel in Europe.
