= Ambient backscatter =

Ambient backscatter uses existing radio frequency signals, such as radio, television and mobile telephony, to transmit data without a battery or power grid connection. Each such device uses an antenna to pick up an existing signal and convert it into tens to hundreds of microwatts of electricity. It uses that power to modify and reflect the signal with encoded data. Antennas on other devices, in turn, detect that signal and can respond accordingly.

Initial implementations can communicate over several feet of distance, even if the transmission towers are up to 10.5 kilometres (6.5 mi) away. Transmission rates were 1k bits per second between devices situated 0.45 metres (1 ft 6 in) apart inside and 0.75 metres (2 ft 6 in) apart outside, sufficient to handle text messages or other small data sets. Circuit sizes can be as small as 1 sq. mm. Later implementation uses Wi-Fi, Bluetooth, FM radio and LoRa transmissions. There exists technology to extend backscatter communication range up-to 3.4 kilometers while consuming 70 μW power at the backscatter tag.

This approach would let mobile and other devices communicate without being turned on. It would also allow unpowered sensors to communicate, allowing them to function in places where external power cannot be conveniently supplied.

In 2021, researchers integrated RF backscatter with Li-Fi to achieve greater range via PassiveLiFi.

== See also ==
- Backscatter
