= Human power =

Work or energy produced from the human body

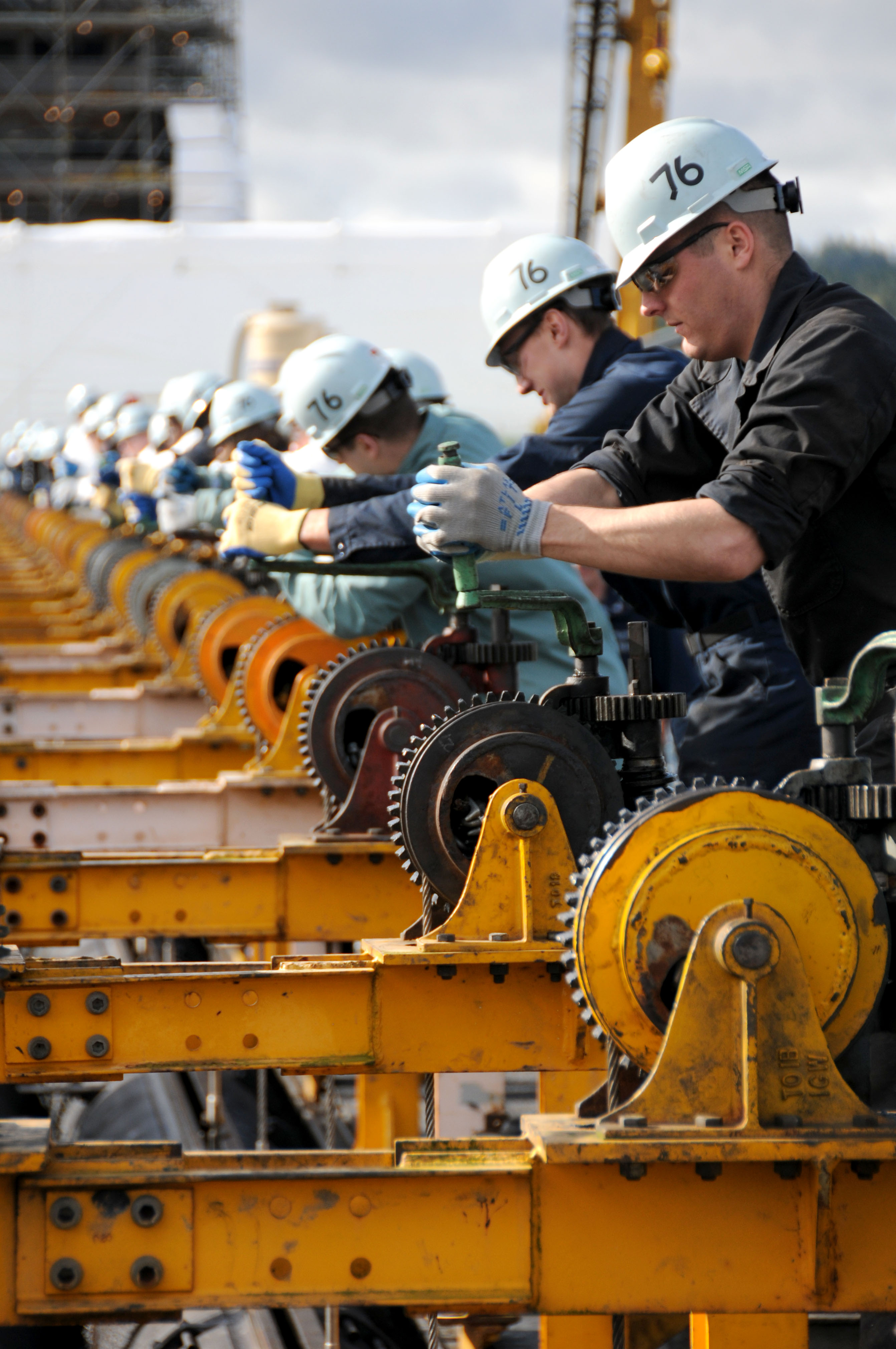
U.S. Navy personnel operating hand-cranked machinery to raise an aircraft catapult on the USS Ronald Reagan (CVN-76)

Human power is the rate of work or energy that is produced from the human body. It can also refer to the power (rate of work per time) of a human. Power comes primarily from muscles, but body heat is also used to do work like warming shelters, food, or other humans.

World records of power performance by humans are of interest to work planners and work-process engineers. The average level of human power that can be maintained over a certain duration of time is interesting to engineers designing work operations in industry.

Human-powered transport includes bicycles, rowing, skiing and many other forms of mobility.

Human-powered equipment is occasionally used to generate, and sometimes to store, electrical energy for use where no other source of power is available. These include the Gibson girl survival radio, wind-up or (clockwork) radio and pedal radio.

== Available power ==
Normal human metabolism produces heat at a basal metabolic rate of around 80 watts (0.1 Hp). When the human body is producing mechanical power using skeletal muscles, additional waste heat is generated within those muscles. How much waste heat generated depends on how much ATP is being regenerated by aerobic or anaerobic means, as well as the type of muscle fibers involved, with fast-twitch fibers being considerably less efficient than slow twitch fibers. The efficiency can be as high as 56% in the first 30 seconds, then gradually declines to an average of 25% over many minutes. That means the human body generates 3 watts of waste heat for every watt of mechanical output power when that output is sustained for more than a few minutes. This is in addition to the basal metabolic rate which itself can increase to more than 80W due to the additional metabolic load from physical exertion.

During a bicycle race, an elite cyclist can produce around 440 watts of mechanical power over an hour and track cyclists in short bursts over 2500 watts; modern racing bicycles have greater than 95% mechanical efficiency. An adult of good fitness is more likely to average between 50 and 150 watts of mechanical power output power for an hour of vigorous exercise while generating roughly 150W to 450W of additional waste heat in the involved muscles. Over an 8-hour work shift, an average, healthy, well-fed and motivated manual laborer may sustain a mechanical power output of around 75 watts. However, the potential yield of human electric power is decreased by the inefficiency of any generator device, since all real generators incur losses during the energy conversion process.

It is possible to use exercise equipment for power generation, by attaching the moving parts to components of electric generators; some home gym equipment uses DC generators to power readouts, displays, and control the amount of resistance offered by the machine. The amount of energy generated is so small compared to industrial power sources that the cost of conversion equipment makes it financially impractical. For example, supplying an average United States home solely with electricity generated from exercise equipment for one day would require more than a hundred people to ride stationary bicycles for all of it.

== Transport ==
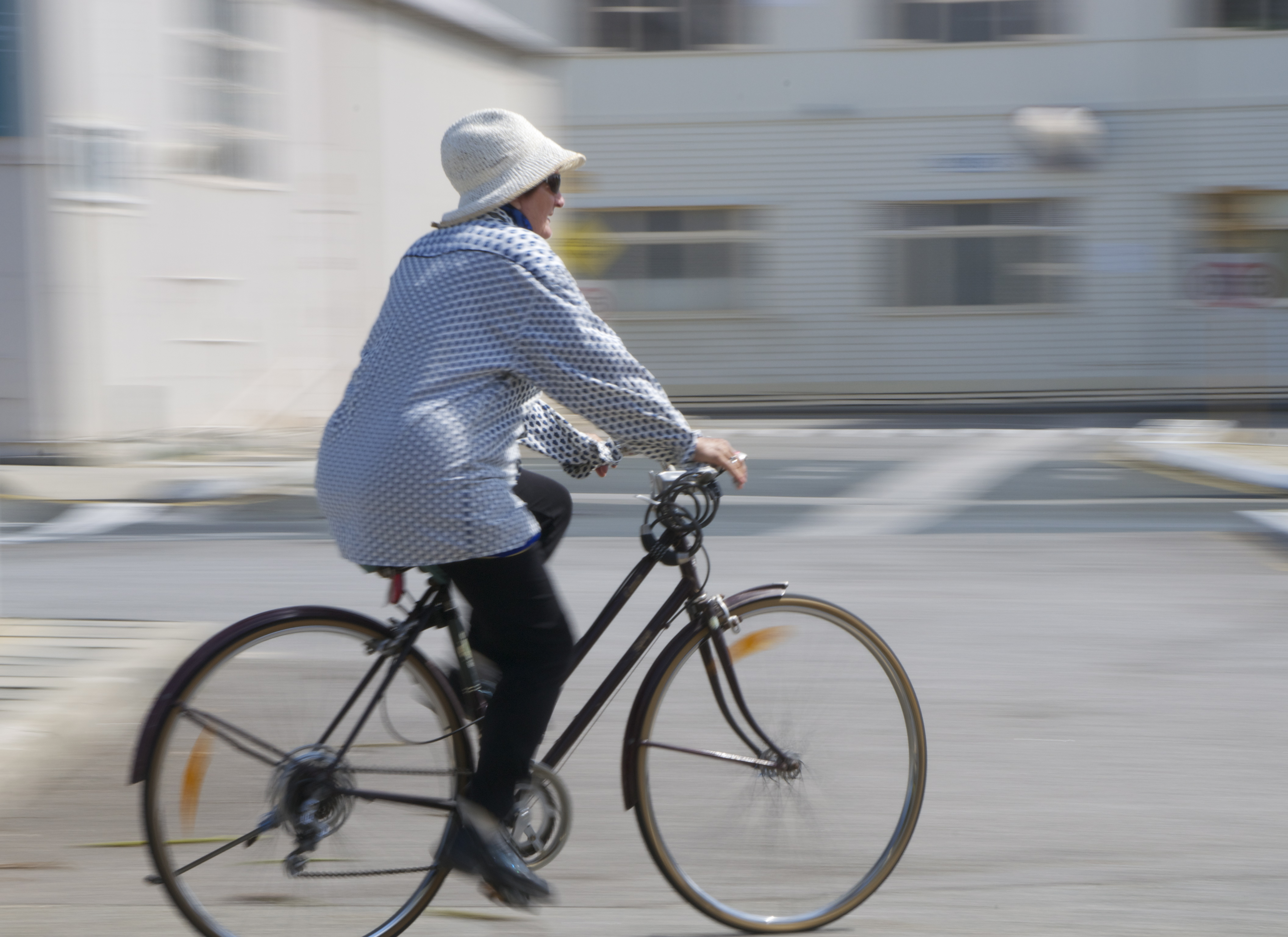
Bicycles are an example of human-powered transportation.

Several forms of transport utilize human power. They include the bicycle, wheelchair, walking, skateboard, wheelbarrow, rowing, skis, and rickshaw. Some forms may utilize more than one person. The historical galley was propelled by freemen or citizens in ancient times, and by slaves captured by pirates in more recent times. The MacCready Gossamer Condor was the first human-powered aircraft capable of controlled and sustained flight, making its first flight in 1977. In 2007, Jason Lewis of Expedition 360 became the first person to circumnavigate the globe at non-polar latitudes using only human power—walking, biking, and rollerblading across the landmasses; and swimming, kayaking, rowing, and using a 26-foot-long pedal-powered boat to cross the oceans.

== General devices and machines ==
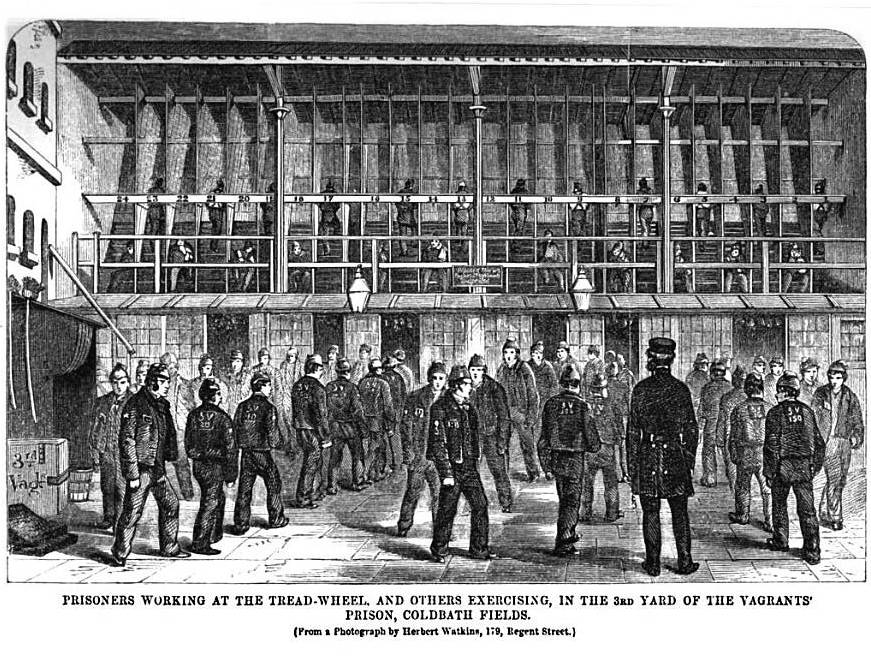
A penal treadwheel used at the Coldbath Fields Prison in London, England in 1864

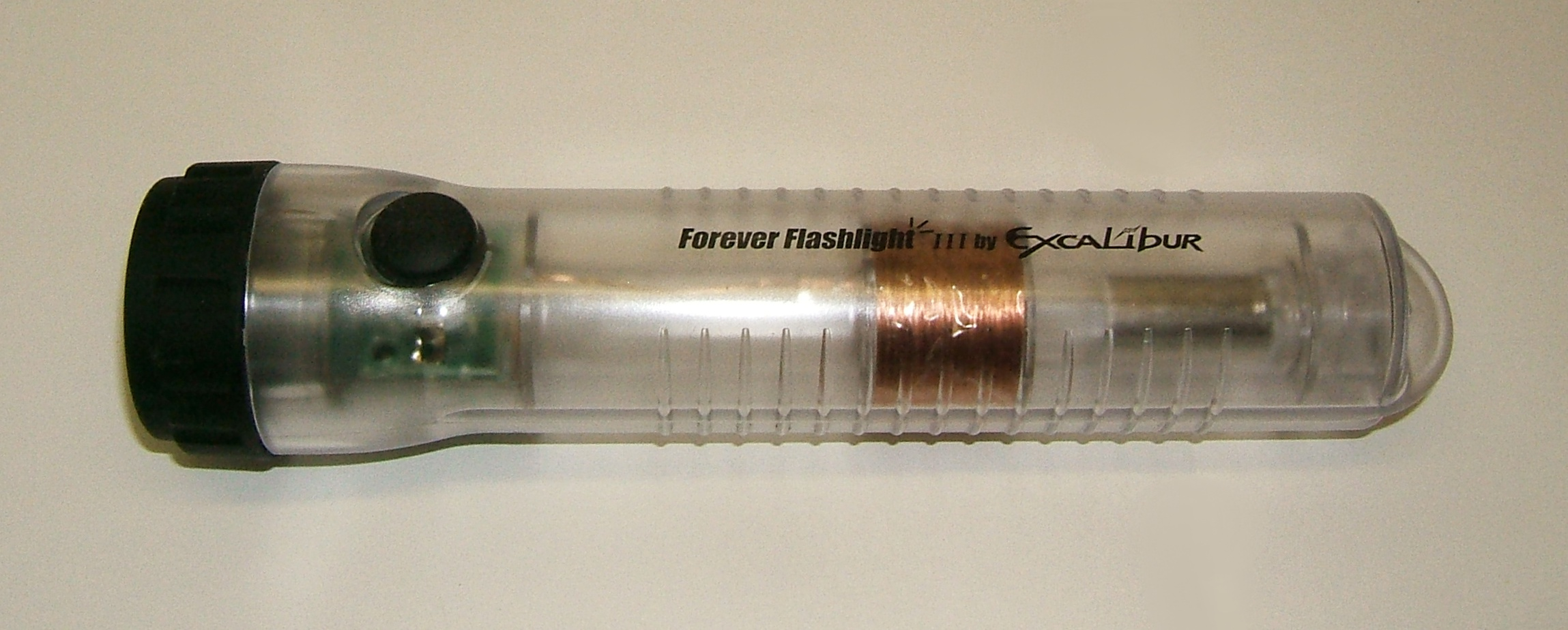
A mechanically powered flashlight. This uses a linear generator and is charged by shaking along its long axis.

Treadwheels, also called treadmills, are engines or machines powered by humans. These may resemble a water wheel in appearance, and can be worked either by a human treading paddles set into its circumference (treadmill), or by a human standing inside it (treadwheel).

Some devices use human power. They may directly use mechanical power from muscles, or a generator may convert energy generated by the body into electrical power.

Human-powered equipment primarily consists of electrical appliances which can be powered by electricity generated by human muscle power as an alternative to conventional sources of electricity such as disposable primary batteries and the electrical grid. Such devices contain electric generators or an induction system to recharge their batteries. Separate crank-operated generators are now available to recharge battery-powered portable electronic devices such as mobile phones. Others, such as mechanically powered flashlights, have the generator integrated within the device. Wrist watches can use muscle power to keep their mainsprings wound up.

An alternative to rechargeable batteries for electricity storage is supercapacitors, now being used in some devices such as the mechanically powered flashlight shown here. Devices that store the energy mechanically, rather than electrically, include clockwork radios with a mainspring, which is wound up by a crank and turns a generator to power the radio.

An early example of regular use of human-powered electrical equipment is in early telephone systems; current to ring the remote bell was provided by a subscriber cranking a handle on the telephone, which turned a small magneto generator. Human-powered devices are useful as emergency equipment, when natural disaster, war, or civil disturbance make regular power supplies unavailable. They have also been seen as economical for use in poor countries, where batteries may be expensive and mains electricity unreliable or unavailable. They are also an environmentally preferable alternative to the use of disposable batteries, which are a wasteful source of energy and may introduce heavy metals into the environment. Communication is a common application for the relatively small amount of electric power that can be generated by a human turning a generator.

== Human-powered radio ==
=== Survival radio ===
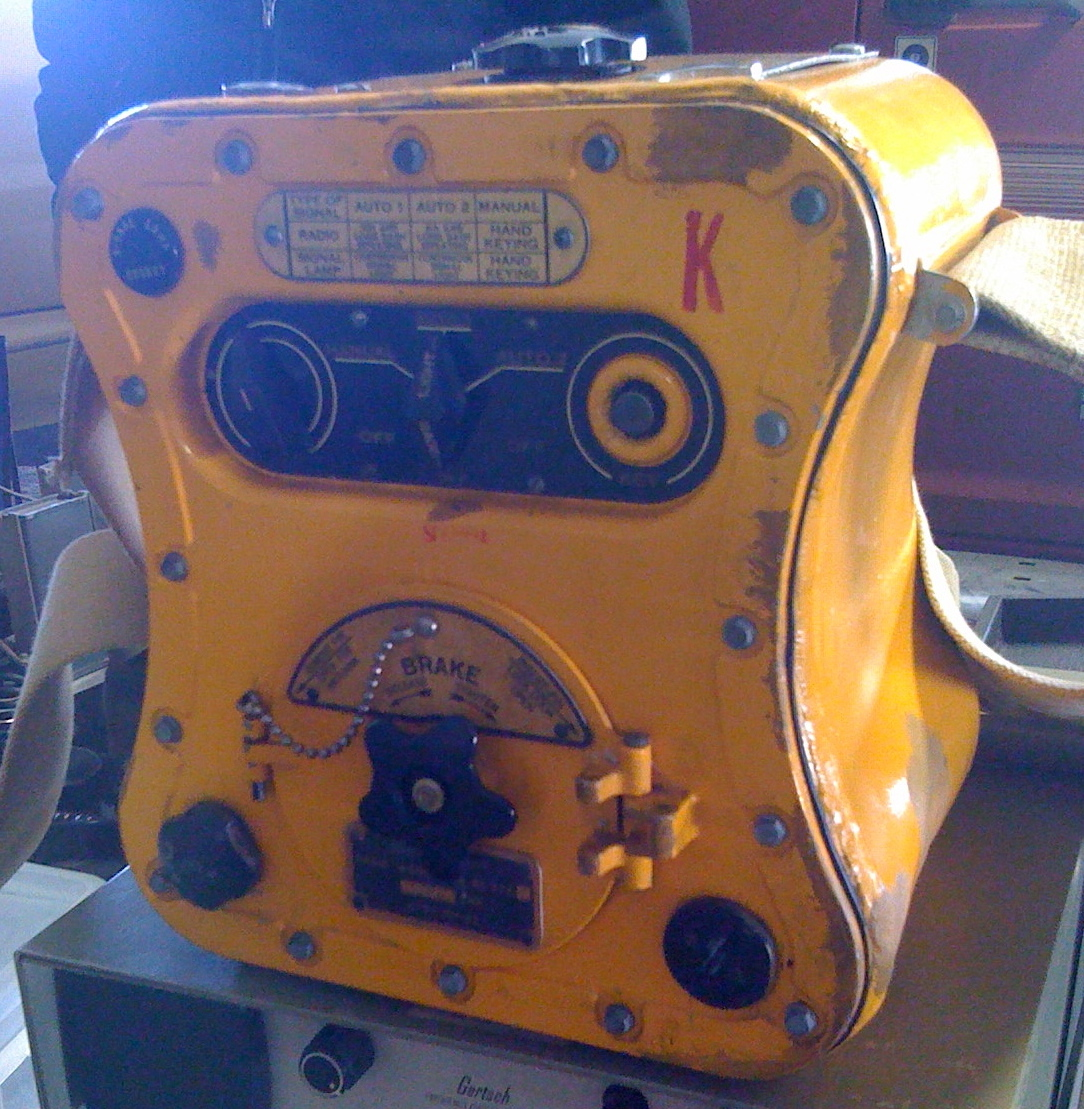
BC-778 "Gibson Girl" radio transmitter

The World War II-era Gibson girl survival radio used a hand-cranked generator to provide power; this avoided the unreliable performance of dry-cell batteries that might be stored for months before they were needed, although it had the drawback that the survivor had to be fit enough to turn the crank. Survival radios were invented and deployed by both sides during the war. The SCR-578 (and the similar post-war AN/CRT-3) survival radio transmitters carried by aircraft on over-water operations were given the nickname "Gibson Girl" because of their "hourglass" shape, which allowed them to be held stationary between the legs while the generator handle was turned.

=== Military radio ===
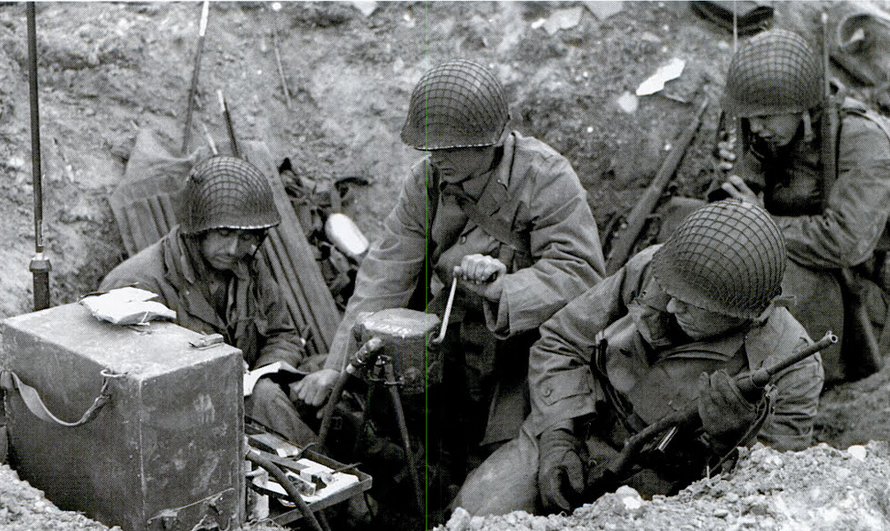
U.S. soldiers using a GN-45 hand crank generator to power their radio set during World War II

During World War II, U.S. troops sometimes employed hand crank generators, GN-35 and GN-45, to power Signal Corps Radio transmitter/receivers. The hand cranking was laborious, but generated sufficient current for smaller radio sets, such as the SCR-131, SCR-161, SCR-171, SCR-284, and SCR-694.

=== Windup radio ===
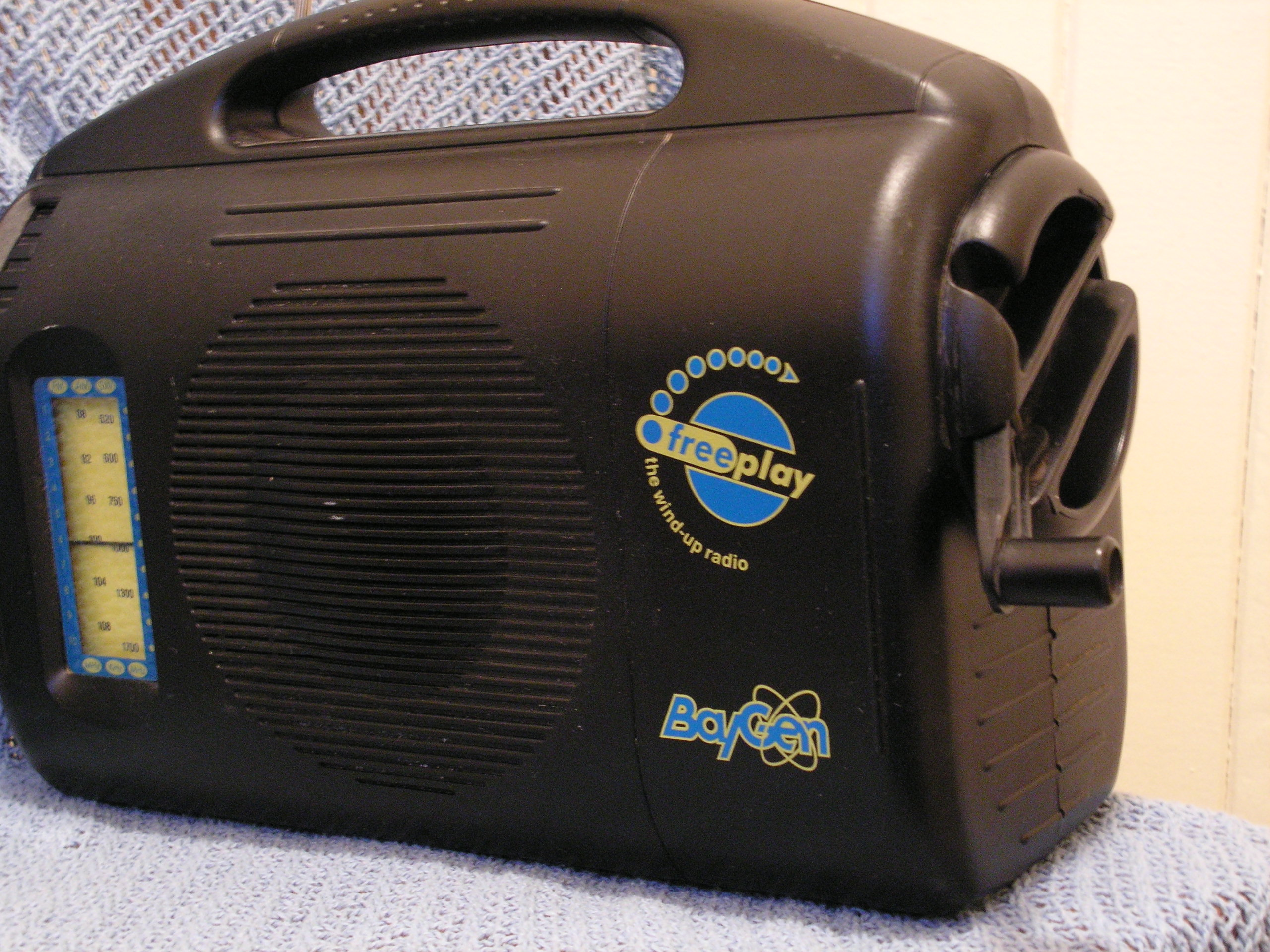
The original Baygen clockwork radio with crank in winding position

A windup radio or clockwork radio is a radio that is powered by human muscle power rather than batteries or the electrical grid. In the most common arrangement, an internal electric generator is run by a mainspring, which is wound by a hand crank on the case. Turning the crank winds the spring and a full winding will allow several hours of operation. Alternatively, the generator can charge an internal battery.

Radios powered by handcranked generators are not new, but their market was previously seen as limited to emergency or military organizations. The modern clockwork radio was designed and patented in 1991 by British inventor Trevor Baylis as a response to the HIV/AIDS crisis. He envisioned it as a radio for use by poor people in developing countries, especially in Africa, without access to batteries. In 1994, British accountant Chris Staines and his South African partner, Rory Stear, secured the worldwide license to the invention and cofounded Baygen Power Industries (now Freeplay Energy Ltd), which produced the first commercial model. The key to its design, which is no longer in use, was the use of a constant-velocity spring to store the potential energy. After Baylis lost control of his invention when Baygen became Freeplay, the Freeplay Energy units switched to disposable batteries charged by cheaper hand-crank generators.

Like other self-powered equipment, windup radios were intended for camping, emergencies and for areas where there is no electrical grid and replacement batteries are hard to obtain, such as in developing countries or remote settlements. They are also useful where a radio is not used on a regular basis and batteries would deteriorate, such as at a vacation house or cabin.

Windup radios designed for emergency use often include flashlights, blinking emergency lights, and emergency sirens. They also may include multiple alternate power sources, such as disposable or rechargeable batteries, cigarette lighter receptacles, and solar cells.

== Pedal-powered transmitter ==
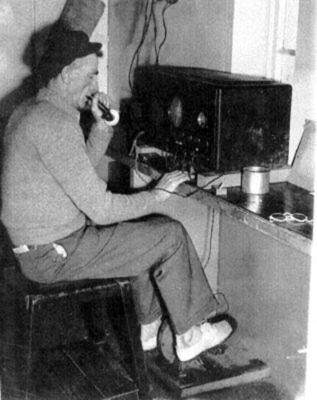
Pedal radio being used in South Solitary Island lighthouse, to communicate with Norah Head Lightstation, 1946

The pedal radio (or pedal wireless) was a radio transmitter-receiver powered by a pedal-driven generator. It was developed by South Australian engineer and inventor Alfred Traeger in 1929 as a way of providing radio communications to remote homesteads and cattle stations in the Australian outback. There were no mains or generator power available at the time and batteries to provide the power required would have been too expensive. It was a highly important invention, as it was this technology that enabled the Royal Flying Doctor Service, and later the School of the Air, linking people living remotely to emergency services and education.

== See also ==
- Batteryless radio
- Bottle dynamo
- Crank (mechanism)
- Energy harvesting
- Manual labour
- Micropower
- Pavegen
